

88001–88100 

|-bgcolor=#d6d6d6
| 88001 ||  || — || October 24, 2000 || Socorro || LINEAR || KOR || align=right | 3.4 km || 
|-id=002 bgcolor=#d6d6d6
| 88002 ||  || — || October 24, 2000 || Socorro || LINEAR || KOR || align=right | 2.9 km || 
|-id=003 bgcolor=#d6d6d6
| 88003 ||  || — || October 24, 2000 || Socorro || LINEAR || THM || align=right | 7.3 km || 
|-id=004 bgcolor=#E9E9E9
| 88004 ||  || — || October 24, 2000 || Socorro || LINEAR || — || align=right | 3.0 km || 
|-id=005 bgcolor=#d6d6d6
| 88005 ||  || — || October 24, 2000 || Socorro || LINEAR || — || align=right | 5.0 km || 
|-id=006 bgcolor=#E9E9E9
| 88006 ||  || — || October 24, 2000 || Socorro || LINEAR || — || align=right | 2.6 km || 
|-id=007 bgcolor=#d6d6d6
| 88007 ||  || — || October 24, 2000 || Socorro || LINEAR || — || align=right | 5.5 km || 
|-id=008 bgcolor=#d6d6d6
| 88008 ||  || — || October 24, 2000 || Socorro || LINEAR || KOR || align=right | 3.1 km || 
|-id=009 bgcolor=#d6d6d6
| 88009 ||  || — || October 24, 2000 || Socorro || LINEAR || — || align=right | 8.7 km || 
|-id=010 bgcolor=#E9E9E9
| 88010 ||  || — || October 24, 2000 || Socorro || LINEAR || — || align=right | 2.9 km || 
|-id=011 bgcolor=#E9E9E9
| 88011 ||  || — || October 25, 2000 || Socorro || LINEAR || — || align=right | 3.9 km || 
|-id=012 bgcolor=#E9E9E9
| 88012 ||  || — || October 25, 2000 || Socorro || LINEAR || EUN || align=right | 2.3 km || 
|-id=013 bgcolor=#E9E9E9
| 88013 ||  || — || October 25, 2000 || Socorro || LINEAR || HOF || align=right | 4.8 km || 
|-id=014 bgcolor=#E9E9E9
| 88014 ||  || — || October 25, 2000 || Socorro || LINEAR || — || align=right | 2.6 km || 
|-id=015 bgcolor=#d6d6d6
| 88015 ||  || — || October 25, 2000 || Socorro || LINEAR || — || align=right | 4.8 km || 
|-id=016 bgcolor=#E9E9E9
| 88016 ||  || — || October 25, 2000 || Socorro || LINEAR || — || align=right | 2.5 km || 
|-id=017 bgcolor=#E9E9E9
| 88017 ||  || — || October 25, 2000 || Socorro || LINEAR || GEF || align=right | 7.5 km || 
|-id=018 bgcolor=#E9E9E9
| 88018 ||  || — || October 25, 2000 || Socorro || LINEAR || — || align=right | 3.6 km || 
|-id=019 bgcolor=#E9E9E9
| 88019 ||  || — || October 25, 2000 || Socorro || LINEAR || — || align=right | 4.7 km || 
|-id=020 bgcolor=#E9E9E9
| 88020 ||  || — || October 25, 2000 || Socorro || LINEAR || PAD || align=right | 3.0 km || 
|-id=021 bgcolor=#E9E9E9
| 88021 ||  || — || October 25, 2000 || Socorro || LINEAR || GEF || align=right | 3.0 km || 
|-id=022 bgcolor=#E9E9E9
| 88022 ||  || — || October 25, 2000 || Socorro || LINEAR || — || align=right | 2.8 km || 
|-id=023 bgcolor=#d6d6d6
| 88023 ||  || — || October 25, 2000 || Socorro || LINEAR || — || align=right | 4.7 km || 
|-id=024 bgcolor=#E9E9E9
| 88024 ||  || — || October 31, 2000 || Socorro || LINEAR || — || align=right | 4.5 km || 
|-id=025 bgcolor=#E9E9E9
| 88025 ||  || — || October 24, 2000 || Socorro || LINEAR || — || align=right | 2.6 km || 
|-id=026 bgcolor=#E9E9E9
| 88026 ||  || — || October 24, 2000 || Socorro || LINEAR || INO || align=right | 5.8 km || 
|-id=027 bgcolor=#E9E9E9
| 88027 ||  || — || October 24, 2000 || Socorro || LINEAR || — || align=right | 4.5 km || 
|-id=028 bgcolor=#d6d6d6
| 88028 ||  || — || October 30, 2000 || Socorro || LINEAR || 7:4 || align=right | 8.3 km || 
|-id=029 bgcolor=#E9E9E9
| 88029 ||  || — || October 31, 2000 || Socorro || LINEAR || — || align=right | 3.6 km || 
|-id=030 bgcolor=#E9E9E9
| 88030 ||  || — || October 31, 2000 || Socorro || LINEAR || — || align=right | 3.4 km || 
|-id=031 bgcolor=#d6d6d6
| 88031 ||  || — || October 31, 2000 || Socorro || LINEAR || — || align=right | 11 km || 
|-id=032 bgcolor=#d6d6d6
| 88032 ||  || — || October 31, 2000 || Socorro || LINEAR || LUT || align=right | 8.7 km || 
|-id=033 bgcolor=#E9E9E9
| 88033 ||  || — || October 25, 2000 || Socorro || LINEAR || MRX || align=right | 1.9 km || 
|-id=034 bgcolor=#d6d6d6
| 88034 ||  || — || October 25, 2000 || Socorro || LINEAR || CHA || align=right | 3.8 km || 
|-id=035 bgcolor=#d6d6d6
| 88035 ||  || — || October 25, 2000 || Socorro || LINEAR || EOS || align=right | 4.0 km || 
|-id=036 bgcolor=#d6d6d6
| 88036 ||  || — || October 25, 2000 || Socorro || LINEAR || CHA || align=right | 4.3 km || 
|-id=037 bgcolor=#E9E9E9
| 88037 ||  || — || October 25, 2000 || Socorro || LINEAR || — || align=right | 4.5 km || 
|-id=038 bgcolor=#E9E9E9
| 88038 ||  || — || October 25, 2000 || Socorro || LINEAR || HOF || align=right | 5.8 km || 
|-id=039 bgcolor=#d6d6d6
| 88039 ||  || — || October 25, 2000 || Socorro || LINEAR || EOS || align=right | 6.7 km || 
|-id=040 bgcolor=#d6d6d6
| 88040 ||  || — || October 25, 2000 || Socorro || LINEAR || — || align=right | 5.0 km || 
|-id=041 bgcolor=#d6d6d6
| 88041 ||  || — || October 25, 2000 || Socorro || LINEAR || HYG || align=right | 6.8 km || 
|-id=042 bgcolor=#E9E9E9
| 88042 ||  || — || October 25, 2000 || Socorro || LINEAR || — || align=right | 4.2 km || 
|-id=043 bgcolor=#d6d6d6
| 88043 ||  || — || October 29, 2000 || Socorro || LINEAR || Tj (2.68) || align=right | 8.9 km || 
|-id=044 bgcolor=#E9E9E9
| 88044 ||  || — || October 29, 2000 || Socorro || LINEAR || JUN || align=right | 6.4 km || 
|-id=045 bgcolor=#d6d6d6
| 88045 ||  || — || November 1, 2000 || Socorro || LINEAR || KOR || align=right | 2.7 km || 
|-id=046 bgcolor=#d6d6d6
| 88046 ||  || — || November 1, 2000 || Socorro || LINEAR || — || align=right | 7.3 km || 
|-id=047 bgcolor=#E9E9E9
| 88047 ||  || — || November 1, 2000 || Socorro || LINEAR || — || align=right | 5.1 km || 
|-id=048 bgcolor=#d6d6d6
| 88048 ||  || — || November 1, 2000 || Socorro || LINEAR || HYG || align=right | 6.9 km || 
|-id=049 bgcolor=#E9E9E9
| 88049 ||  || — || November 1, 2000 || Socorro || LINEAR || GEF || align=right | 2.5 km || 
|-id=050 bgcolor=#E9E9E9
| 88050 ||  || — || November 1, 2000 || Socorro || LINEAR || — || align=right | 4.9 km || 
|-id=051 bgcolor=#d6d6d6
| 88051 ||  || — || November 1, 2000 || Socorro || LINEAR || KOR || align=right | 2.8 km || 
|-id=052 bgcolor=#E9E9E9
| 88052 ||  || — || November 1, 2000 || Socorro || LINEAR || MRX || align=right | 2.0 km || 
|-id=053 bgcolor=#E9E9E9
| 88053 ||  || — || November 1, 2000 || Socorro || LINEAR || AGN || align=right | 2.5 km || 
|-id=054 bgcolor=#E9E9E9
| 88054 ||  || — || November 1, 2000 || Socorro || LINEAR || AEO || align=right | 4.1 km || 
|-id=055 bgcolor=#E9E9E9
| 88055 ||  || — || November 1, 2000 || Socorro || LINEAR || — || align=right | 5.4 km || 
|-id=056 bgcolor=#d6d6d6
| 88056 ||  || — || November 1, 2000 || Socorro || LINEAR || — || align=right | 6.1 km || 
|-id=057 bgcolor=#d6d6d6
| 88057 ||  || — || November 1, 2000 || Socorro || LINEAR || 629 || align=right | 3.4 km || 
|-id=058 bgcolor=#E9E9E9
| 88058 ||  || — || November 1, 2000 || Socorro || LINEAR || — || align=right | 4.6 km || 
|-id=059 bgcolor=#E9E9E9
| 88059 ||  || — || November 1, 2000 || Socorro || LINEAR || — || align=right | 4.3 km || 
|-id=060 bgcolor=#E9E9E9
| 88060 ||  || — || November 2, 2000 || Socorro || LINEAR || — || align=right | 5.4 km || 
|-id=061 bgcolor=#d6d6d6
| 88061 ||  || — || November 1, 2000 || Socorro || LINEAR || — || align=right | 3.1 km || 
|-id=062 bgcolor=#E9E9E9
| 88062 ||  || — || November 2, 2000 || Socorro || LINEAR || MRX || align=right | 2.5 km || 
|-id=063 bgcolor=#d6d6d6
| 88063 ||  || — || November 3, 2000 || Socorro || LINEAR || — || align=right | 5.7 km || 
|-id=064 bgcolor=#d6d6d6
| 88064 ||  || — || November 3, 2000 || Socorro || LINEAR || — || align=right | 10 km || 
|-id=065 bgcolor=#d6d6d6
| 88065 ||  || — || November 3, 2000 || Socorro || LINEAR || — || align=right | 4.7 km || 
|-id=066 bgcolor=#d6d6d6
| 88066 ||  || — || November 1, 2000 || Socorro || LINEAR || — || align=right | 4.5 km || 
|-id=067 bgcolor=#E9E9E9
| 88067 ||  || — || November 2, 2000 || Socorro || LINEAR || — || align=right | 3.5 km || 
|-id=068 bgcolor=#d6d6d6
| 88068 ||  || — || November 2, 2000 || Socorro || LINEAR || HYG || align=right | 7.8 km || 
|-id=069 bgcolor=#d6d6d6
| 88069 ||  || — || November 3, 2000 || Socorro || LINEAR || — || align=right | 8.5 km || 
|-id=070 bgcolor=#E9E9E9
| 88070 ||  || — || November 3, 2000 || Socorro || LINEAR || — || align=right | 5.8 km || 
|-id=071 bgcolor=#d6d6d6
| 88071 Taniguchijiro ||  ||  || November 4, 2000 || Saji || Saji Obs. || 7:4 || align=right | 8.1 km || 
|-id=072 bgcolor=#d6d6d6
| 88072 || 2000 WB || — || November 16, 2000 || Kitt Peak || Spacewatch || THM || align=right | 7.3 km || 
|-id=073 bgcolor=#E9E9E9
| 88073 ||  || — || November 19, 2000 || Socorro || LINEAR || HNS || align=right | 3.6 km || 
|-id=074 bgcolor=#d6d6d6
| 88074 ||  || — || November 19, 2000 || Socorro || LINEAR || EOS || align=right | 4.0 km || 
|-id=075 bgcolor=#E9E9E9
| 88075 ||  || — || November 20, 2000 || Socorro || LINEAR || — || align=right | 2.1 km || 
|-id=076 bgcolor=#d6d6d6
| 88076 ||  || — || November 19, 2000 || Socorro || LINEAR || — || align=right | 6.3 km || 
|-id=077 bgcolor=#E9E9E9
| 88077 ||  || — || November 20, 2000 || Socorro || LINEAR || AGN || align=right | 2.8 km || 
|-id=078 bgcolor=#d6d6d6
| 88078 ||  || — || November 20, 2000 || Socorro || LINEAR || — || align=right | 5.7 km || 
|-id=079 bgcolor=#d6d6d6
| 88079 ||  || — || November 21, 2000 || Socorro || LINEAR || THM || align=right | 5.5 km || 
|-id=080 bgcolor=#d6d6d6
| 88080 ||  || — || November 21, 2000 || Socorro || LINEAR || — || align=right | 4.9 km || 
|-id=081 bgcolor=#E9E9E9
| 88081 ||  || — || November 20, 2000 || Socorro || LINEAR || — || align=right | 4.7 km || 
|-id=082 bgcolor=#d6d6d6
| 88082 ||  || — || November 21, 2000 || Socorro || LINEAR || EUP || align=right | 9.7 km || 
|-id=083 bgcolor=#E9E9E9
| 88083 ||  || — || November 22, 2000 || Haleakala || NEAT || — || align=right | 6.7 km || 
|-id=084 bgcolor=#E9E9E9
| 88084 ||  || — || November 20, 2000 || Socorro || LINEAR || — || align=right | 2.4 km || 
|-id=085 bgcolor=#d6d6d6
| 88085 ||  || — || November 20, 2000 || Socorro || LINEAR || VER || align=right | 7.1 km || 
|-id=086 bgcolor=#d6d6d6
| 88086 ||  || — || November 20, 2000 || Socorro || LINEAR || — || align=right | 6.3 km || 
|-id=087 bgcolor=#d6d6d6
| 88087 ||  || — || November 20, 2000 || Socorro || LINEAR || CRO || align=right | 7.0 km || 
|-id=088 bgcolor=#E9E9E9
| 88088 ||  || — || November 21, 2000 || Socorro || LINEAR || — || align=right | 4.7 km || 
|-id=089 bgcolor=#d6d6d6
| 88089 ||  || — || November 21, 2000 || Socorro || LINEAR || — || align=right | 7.0 km || 
|-id=090 bgcolor=#d6d6d6
| 88090 ||  || — || November 21, 2000 || Socorro || LINEAR || — || align=right | 11 km || 
|-id=091 bgcolor=#E9E9E9
| 88091 ||  || — || November 21, 2000 || Socorro || LINEAR || — || align=right | 3.6 km || 
|-id=092 bgcolor=#E9E9E9
| 88092 ||  || — || November 26, 2000 || Socorro || LINEAR || — || align=right | 3.1 km || 
|-id=093 bgcolor=#E9E9E9
| 88093 ||  || — || November 20, 2000 || Socorro || LINEAR || — || align=right | 3.1 km || 
|-id=094 bgcolor=#d6d6d6
| 88094 ||  || — || November 20, 2000 || Socorro || LINEAR || — || align=right | 15 km || 
|-id=095 bgcolor=#E9E9E9
| 88095 ||  || — || November 21, 2000 || Socorro || LINEAR || — || align=right | 4.5 km || 
|-id=096 bgcolor=#E9E9E9
| 88096 ||  || — || November 20, 2000 || Anderson Mesa || LONEOS || — || align=right | 3.9 km || 
|-id=097 bgcolor=#E9E9E9
| 88097 ||  || — || November 28, 2000 || Fountain Hills || C. W. Juels || — || align=right | 4.1 km || 
|-id=098 bgcolor=#E9E9E9
| 88098 ||  || — || November 19, 2000 || Socorro || LINEAR || — || align=right | 6.6 km || 
|-id=099 bgcolor=#E9E9E9
| 88099 ||  || — || November 19, 2000 || Socorro || LINEAR || DOR || align=right | 6.2 km || 
|-id=100 bgcolor=#d6d6d6
| 88100 ||  || — || November 20, 2000 || Socorro || LINEAR || LIX || align=right | 7.6 km || 
|}

88101–88200 

|-bgcolor=#d6d6d6
| 88101 ||  || — || November 20, 2000 || Socorro || LINEAR || — || align=right | 4.3 km || 
|-id=102 bgcolor=#d6d6d6
| 88102 ||  || — || November 20, 2000 || Socorro || LINEAR || EOS || align=right | 5.6 km || 
|-id=103 bgcolor=#d6d6d6
| 88103 ||  || — || November 20, 2000 || Socorro || LINEAR || — || align=right | 5.4 km || 
|-id=104 bgcolor=#d6d6d6
| 88104 ||  || — || November 20, 2000 || Socorro || LINEAR || — || align=right | 4.2 km || 
|-id=105 bgcolor=#E9E9E9
| 88105 ||  || — || November 21, 2000 || Socorro || LINEAR || — || align=right | 2.9 km || 
|-id=106 bgcolor=#d6d6d6
| 88106 ||  || — || November 21, 2000 || Socorro || LINEAR || — || align=right | 6.8 km || 
|-id=107 bgcolor=#d6d6d6
| 88107 ||  || — || November 21, 2000 || Socorro || LINEAR || — || align=right | 3.9 km || 
|-id=108 bgcolor=#E9E9E9
| 88108 ||  || — || November 21, 2000 || Socorro || LINEAR || — || align=right | 2.3 km || 
|-id=109 bgcolor=#d6d6d6
| 88109 ||  || — || November 21, 2000 || Socorro || LINEAR || HYG || align=right | 6.6 km || 
|-id=110 bgcolor=#E9E9E9
| 88110 ||  || — || November 21, 2000 || Socorro || LINEAR || — || align=right | 4.2 km || 
|-id=111 bgcolor=#d6d6d6
| 88111 ||  || — || November 25, 2000 || Socorro || LINEAR || ALA || align=right | 10 km || 
|-id=112 bgcolor=#d6d6d6
| 88112 ||  || — || November 26, 2000 || Socorro || LINEAR || — || align=right | 3.7 km || 
|-id=113 bgcolor=#d6d6d6
| 88113 ||  || — || November 20, 2000 || Socorro || LINEAR || — || align=right | 6.6 km || 
|-id=114 bgcolor=#d6d6d6
| 88114 ||  || — || November 20, 2000 || Socorro || LINEAR || EOS || align=right | 4.1 km || 
|-id=115 bgcolor=#E9E9E9
| 88115 ||  || — || November 20, 2000 || Socorro || LINEAR || — || align=right | 4.1 km || 
|-id=116 bgcolor=#E9E9E9
| 88116 ||  || — || November 19, 2000 || Socorro || LINEAR || — || align=right | 5.4 km || 
|-id=117 bgcolor=#E9E9E9
| 88117 ||  || — || November 19, 2000 || Socorro || LINEAR || — || align=right | 12 km || 
|-id=118 bgcolor=#d6d6d6
| 88118 ||  || — || November 19, 2000 || Socorro || LINEAR || — || align=right | 9.1 km || 
|-id=119 bgcolor=#d6d6d6
| 88119 ||  || — || November 19, 2000 || Socorro || LINEAR || — || align=right | 6.5 km || 
|-id=120 bgcolor=#d6d6d6
| 88120 ||  || — || November 21, 2000 || Socorro || LINEAR || — || align=right | 5.1 km || 
|-id=121 bgcolor=#d6d6d6
| 88121 ||  || — || November 21, 2000 || Socorro || LINEAR || — || align=right | 5.5 km || 
|-id=122 bgcolor=#d6d6d6
| 88122 ||  || — || November 21, 2000 || Socorro || LINEAR || — || align=right | 5.4 km || 
|-id=123 bgcolor=#d6d6d6
| 88123 ||  || — || November 20, 2000 || Anderson Mesa || LONEOS || — || align=right | 7.6 km || 
|-id=124 bgcolor=#d6d6d6
| 88124 ||  || — || November 20, 2000 || Anderson Mesa || LONEOS || — || align=right | 8.0 km || 
|-id=125 bgcolor=#d6d6d6
| 88125 ||  || — || November 22, 2000 || Haleakala || NEAT || DUR || align=right | 11 km || 
|-id=126 bgcolor=#d6d6d6
| 88126 ||  || — || November 23, 2000 || Haleakala || NEAT || — || align=right | 7.7 km || 
|-id=127 bgcolor=#E9E9E9
| 88127 ||  || — || November 28, 2000 || Haleakala || NEAT || EUN || align=right | 3.2 km || 
|-id=128 bgcolor=#E9E9E9
| 88128 ||  || — || November 27, 2000 || Socorro || LINEAR || JUN || align=right | 5.2 km || 
|-id=129 bgcolor=#d6d6d6
| 88129 ||  || — || November 29, 2000 || Socorro || LINEAR || 7:4 || align=right | 12 km || 
|-id=130 bgcolor=#d6d6d6
| 88130 ||  || — || November 29, 2000 || Socorro || LINEAR || — || align=right | 6.4 km || 
|-id=131 bgcolor=#d6d6d6
| 88131 ||  || — || November 30, 2000 || Socorro || LINEAR || — || align=right | 8.6 km || 
|-id=132 bgcolor=#d6d6d6
| 88132 ||  || — || November 30, 2000 || Socorro || LINEAR || EOS || align=right | 4.1 km || 
|-id=133 bgcolor=#E9E9E9
| 88133 ||  || — || November 30, 2000 || Kitt Peak || Spacewatch || — || align=right | 2.6 km || 
|-id=134 bgcolor=#E9E9E9
| 88134 ||  || — || November 20, 2000 || Anderson Mesa || LONEOS || — || align=right | 2.8 km || 
|-id=135 bgcolor=#d6d6d6
| 88135 ||  || — || November 22, 2000 || Haleakala || NEAT || — || align=right | 4.8 km || 
|-id=136 bgcolor=#E9E9E9
| 88136 ||  || — || November 24, 2000 || Anderson Mesa || LONEOS || — || align=right | 4.5 km || 
|-id=137 bgcolor=#E9E9E9
| 88137 ||  || — || November 25, 2000 || Socorro || LINEAR || — || align=right | 4.0 km || 
|-id=138 bgcolor=#E9E9E9
| 88138 ||  || — || November 25, 2000 || Socorro || LINEAR || GER || align=right | 3.5 km || 
|-id=139 bgcolor=#d6d6d6
| 88139 ||  || — || November 25, 2000 || Socorro || LINEAR || — || align=right | 6.5 km || 
|-id=140 bgcolor=#d6d6d6
| 88140 ||  || — || November 26, 2000 || Socorro || LINEAR || — || align=right | 11 km || 
|-id=141 bgcolor=#d6d6d6
| 88141 ||  || — || November 26, 2000 || Socorro || LINEAR || — || align=right | 8.9 km || 
|-id=142 bgcolor=#d6d6d6
| 88142 ||  || — || November 26, 2000 || Socorro || LINEAR || — || align=right | 11 km || 
|-id=143 bgcolor=#d6d6d6
| 88143 ||  || — || November 27, 2000 || Socorro || LINEAR || URS || align=right | 5.3 km || 
|-id=144 bgcolor=#E9E9E9
| 88144 ||  || — || November 25, 2000 || Socorro || LINEAR || — || align=right | 3.2 km || 
|-id=145 bgcolor=#E9E9E9
| 88145 ||  || — || November 20, 2000 || Anderson Mesa || LONEOS || — || align=right | 2.7 km || 
|-id=146 bgcolor=#d6d6d6
| 88146 Castello ||  ||  || November 30, 2000 || Gnosca || S. Sposetti || KOR || align=right | 3.2 km || 
|-id=147 bgcolor=#d6d6d6
| 88147 ||  || — || November 28, 2000 || Socorro || LINEAR || KOR || align=right | 3.5 km || 
|-id=148 bgcolor=#d6d6d6
| 88148 ||  || — || November 19, 2000 || Anderson Mesa || LONEOS || — || align=right | 7.3 km || 
|-id=149 bgcolor=#d6d6d6
| 88149 ||  || — || December 1, 2000 || Socorro || LINEAR || — || align=right | 8.0 km || 
|-id=150 bgcolor=#E9E9E9
| 88150 ||  || — || December 1, 2000 || Socorro || LINEAR || INO || align=right | 2.4 km || 
|-id=151 bgcolor=#d6d6d6
| 88151 ||  || — || December 1, 2000 || Socorro || LINEAR || — || align=right | 7.1 km || 
|-id=152 bgcolor=#d6d6d6
| 88152 ||  || — || December 1, 2000 || Socorro || LINEAR || EOS || align=right | 12 km || 
|-id=153 bgcolor=#d6d6d6
| 88153 ||  || — || December 1, 2000 || Socorro || LINEAR || — || align=right | 8.3 km || 
|-id=154 bgcolor=#d6d6d6
| 88154 ||  || — || December 1, 2000 || Socorro || LINEAR || EOS || align=right | 4.3 km || 
|-id=155 bgcolor=#d6d6d6
| 88155 ||  || — || December 1, 2000 || Socorro || LINEAR || EUP || align=right | 9.2 km || 
|-id=156 bgcolor=#E9E9E9
| 88156 ||  || — || December 1, 2000 || Socorro || LINEAR || — || align=right | 3.0 km || 
|-id=157 bgcolor=#d6d6d6
| 88157 ||  || — || December 4, 2000 || Socorro || LINEAR || — || align=right | 5.9 km || 
|-id=158 bgcolor=#d6d6d6
| 88158 ||  || — || December 4, 2000 || Haleakala || NEAT || ALA || align=right | 8.7 km || 
|-id=159 bgcolor=#E9E9E9
| 88159 ||  || — || December 1, 2000 || Socorro || LINEAR || — || align=right | 2.9 km || 
|-id=160 bgcolor=#E9E9E9
| 88160 ||  || — || December 4, 2000 || Socorro || LINEAR || — || align=right | 4.2 km || 
|-id=161 bgcolor=#E9E9E9
| 88161 ||  || — || December 4, 2000 || Socorro || LINEAR || — || align=right | 13 km || 
|-id=162 bgcolor=#E9E9E9
| 88162 ||  || — || December 4, 2000 || Socorro || LINEAR || — || align=right | 4.3 km || 
|-id=163 bgcolor=#d6d6d6
| 88163 ||  || — || December 4, 2000 || Socorro || LINEAR || — || align=right | 9.3 km || 
|-id=164 bgcolor=#E9E9E9
| 88164 ||  || — || December 4, 2000 || Socorro || LINEAR || — || align=right | 3.2 km || 
|-id=165 bgcolor=#E9E9E9
| 88165 ||  || — || December 4, 2000 || Socorro || LINEAR || — || align=right | 3.6 km || 
|-id=166 bgcolor=#E9E9E9
| 88166 ||  || — || December 4, 2000 || Socorro || LINEAR || GEF || align=right | 2.7 km || 
|-id=167 bgcolor=#d6d6d6
| 88167 ||  || — || December 4, 2000 || Socorro || LINEAR || — || align=right | 7.4 km || 
|-id=168 bgcolor=#d6d6d6
| 88168 ||  || — || December 4, 2000 || Socorro || LINEAR || EOS || align=right | 4.7 km || 
|-id=169 bgcolor=#d6d6d6
| 88169 ||  || — || December 4, 2000 || Socorro || LINEAR || — || align=right | 11 km || 
|-id=170 bgcolor=#d6d6d6
| 88170 ||  || — || December 4, 2000 || Socorro || LINEAR || — || align=right | 8.8 km || 
|-id=171 bgcolor=#d6d6d6
| 88171 ||  || — || December 4, 2000 || Socorro || LINEAR || — || align=right | 3.9 km || 
|-id=172 bgcolor=#E9E9E9
| 88172 ||  || — || December 4, 2000 || Socorro || LINEAR || — || align=right | 3.7 km || 
|-id=173 bgcolor=#E9E9E9
| 88173 ||  || — || December 4, 2000 || Socorro || LINEAR || — || align=right | 6.6 km || 
|-id=174 bgcolor=#E9E9E9
| 88174 ||  || — || December 4, 2000 || Socorro || LINEAR || — || align=right | 5.2 km || 
|-id=175 bgcolor=#d6d6d6
| 88175 ||  || — || December 4, 2000 || Socorro || LINEAR || VER || align=right | 7.7 km || 
|-id=176 bgcolor=#d6d6d6
| 88176 ||  || — || December 4, 2000 || Socorro || LINEAR || — || align=right | 6.1 km || 
|-id=177 bgcolor=#d6d6d6
| 88177 ||  || — || December 4, 2000 || Socorro || LINEAR || — || align=right | 6.6 km || 
|-id=178 bgcolor=#d6d6d6
| 88178 ||  || — || December 4, 2000 || Socorro || LINEAR || — || align=right | 6.6 km || 
|-id=179 bgcolor=#d6d6d6
| 88179 ||  || — || December 4, 2000 || Socorro || LINEAR || — || align=right | 6.9 km || 
|-id=180 bgcolor=#E9E9E9
| 88180 ||  || — || December 5, 2000 || Socorro || LINEAR || — || align=right | 5.8 km || 
|-id=181 bgcolor=#E9E9E9
| 88181 ||  || — || December 5, 2000 || Socorro || LINEAR || EUN || align=right | 3.0 km || 
|-id=182 bgcolor=#E9E9E9
| 88182 ||  || — || December 5, 2000 || Socorro || LINEAR || — || align=right | 5.3 km || 
|-id=183 bgcolor=#d6d6d6
| 88183 ||  || — || December 5, 2000 || Socorro || LINEAR || — || align=right | 7.8 km || 
|-id=184 bgcolor=#E9E9E9
| 88184 ||  || — || December 5, 2000 || Socorro || LINEAR || JUN || align=right | 6.1 km || 
|-id=185 bgcolor=#E9E9E9
| 88185 ||  || — || December 5, 2000 || Socorro || LINEAR || — || align=right | 5.4 km || 
|-id=186 bgcolor=#E9E9E9
| 88186 ||  || — || December 5, 2000 || Socorro || LINEAR || — || align=right | 3.2 km || 
|-id=187 bgcolor=#E9E9E9
| 88187 ||  || — || December 5, 2000 || Socorro || LINEAR || IAN || align=right | 1.8 km || 
|-id=188 bgcolor=#FFC2E0
| 88188 ||  || — || December 5, 2000 || Socorro || LINEAR || AMO +1km || align=right | 1.4 km || 
|-id=189 bgcolor=#d6d6d6
| 88189 ||  || — || December 6, 2000 || Socorro || LINEAR || — || align=right | 9.4 km || 
|-id=190 bgcolor=#E9E9E9
| 88190 ||  || — || December 20, 2000 || Socorro || LINEAR || — || align=right | 3.4 km || 
|-id=191 bgcolor=#FA8072
| 88191 ||  || — || December 30, 2000 || Haleakala || NEAT || — || align=right | 1.3 km || 
|-id=192 bgcolor=#d6d6d6
| 88192 ||  || — || December 30, 2000 || Socorro || LINEAR || — || align=right | 7.9 km || 
|-id=193 bgcolor=#d6d6d6
| 88193 ||  || — || December 30, 2000 || Socorro || LINEAR || — || align=right | 5.1 km || 
|-id=194 bgcolor=#d6d6d6
| 88194 ||  || — || December 30, 2000 || Socorro || LINEAR || — || align=right | 10 km || 
|-id=195 bgcolor=#d6d6d6
| 88195 ||  || — || December 30, 2000 || Socorro || LINEAR || EOS || align=right | 4.7 km || 
|-id=196 bgcolor=#d6d6d6
| 88196 ||  || — || December 16, 2000 || Kitt Peak || Spacewatch || — || align=right | 5.4 km || 
|-id=197 bgcolor=#fefefe
| 88197 ||  || — || December 28, 2000 || Socorro || LINEAR || H || align=right | 1.2 km || 
|-id=198 bgcolor=#d6d6d6
| 88198 ||  || — || December 30, 2000 || Socorro || LINEAR || — || align=right | 5.4 km || 
|-id=199 bgcolor=#d6d6d6
| 88199 ||  || — || December 30, 2000 || Socorro || LINEAR || EOS || align=right | 3.7 km || 
|-id=200 bgcolor=#d6d6d6
| 88200 ||  || — || December 30, 2000 || Socorro || LINEAR || — || align=right | 4.8 km || 
|}

88201–88300 

|-bgcolor=#d6d6d6
| 88201 ||  || — || December 30, 2000 || Socorro || LINEAR || ALA || align=right | 12 km || 
|-id=202 bgcolor=#d6d6d6
| 88202 ||  || — || December 30, 2000 || Socorro || LINEAR || HYG || align=right | 8.0 km || 
|-id=203 bgcolor=#E9E9E9
| 88203 ||  || — || December 30, 2000 || Socorro || LINEAR || — || align=right | 2.8 km || 
|-id=204 bgcolor=#d6d6d6
| 88204 ||  || — || December 30, 2000 || Socorro || LINEAR || HYG || align=right | 8.2 km || 
|-id=205 bgcolor=#d6d6d6
| 88205 ||  || — || December 30, 2000 || Socorro || LINEAR || 7:4 || align=right | 8.1 km || 
|-id=206 bgcolor=#fefefe
| 88206 ||  || — || December 30, 2000 || Socorro || LINEAR || H || align=right | 1.2 km || 
|-id=207 bgcolor=#d6d6d6
| 88207 ||  || — || December 18, 2000 || Kitt Peak || Spacewatch || — || align=right | 3.7 km || 
|-id=208 bgcolor=#E9E9E9
| 88208 ||  || — || December 19, 2000 || Haleakala || NEAT || EUN || align=right | 2.9 km || 
|-id=209 bgcolor=#E9E9E9
| 88209 ||  || — || December 22, 2000 || Anderson Mesa || LONEOS || MAR || align=right | 2.8 km || 
|-id=210 bgcolor=#d6d6d6
| 88210 ||  || — || December 29, 2000 || Haleakala || NEAT || — || align=right | 4.6 km || 
|-id=211 bgcolor=#d6d6d6
| 88211 ||  || — || December 30, 2000 || Socorro || LINEAR || — || align=right | 5.9 km || 
|-id=212 bgcolor=#d6d6d6
| 88212 ||  || — || December 18, 2000 || Anderson Mesa || LONEOS || — || align=right | 5.4 km || 
|-id=213 bgcolor=#FFC2E0
| 88213 ||  || — || January 2, 2001 || Socorro || LINEAR || ATE || align=right data-sort-value="0.91" | 910 m || 
|-id=214 bgcolor=#d6d6d6
| 88214 ||  || — || January 3, 2001 || Socorro || LINEAR || ALA || align=right | 8.8 km || 
|-id=215 bgcolor=#E9E9E9
| 88215 ||  || — || January 3, 2001 || Socorro || LINEAR || — || align=right | 6.0 km || 
|-id=216 bgcolor=#E9E9E9
| 88216 ||  || — || January 5, 2001 || Socorro || LINEAR || — || align=right | 2.5 km || 
|-id=217 bgcolor=#d6d6d6
| 88217 ||  || — || January 4, 2001 || Socorro || LINEAR || — || align=right | 8.4 km || 
|-id=218 bgcolor=#d6d6d6
| 88218 ||  || — || January 4, 2001 || Socorro || LINEAR || EOS || align=right | 4.7 km || 
|-id=219 bgcolor=#d6d6d6
| 88219 ||  || — || January 4, 2001 || Socorro || LINEAR || CHA || align=right | 5.5 km || 
|-id=220 bgcolor=#E9E9E9
| 88220 ||  || — || January 3, 2001 || Anderson Mesa || LONEOS || — || align=right | 5.2 km || 
|-id=221 bgcolor=#fefefe
| 88221 ||  || — || January 4, 2001 || Anderson Mesa || LONEOS || V || align=right | 1.7 km || 
|-id=222 bgcolor=#E9E9E9
| 88222 ||  || — || January 15, 2001 || Kvistaberg || UDAS || DOR || align=right | 4.9 km || 
|-id=223 bgcolor=#d6d6d6
| 88223 ||  || — || January 21, 2001 || Socorro || LINEAR || — || align=right | 4.3 km || 
|-id=224 bgcolor=#d6d6d6
| 88224 ||  || — || January 20, 2001 || Socorro || LINEAR || EOS || align=right | 5.3 km || 
|-id=225 bgcolor=#C2FFFF
| 88225 ||  || — || January 20, 2001 || Socorro || LINEAR || L4 || align=right | 21 km || 
|-id=226 bgcolor=#fefefe
| 88226 ||  || — || January 24, 2001 || Socorro || LINEAR || H || align=right | 2.0 km || 
|-id=227 bgcolor=#C2FFFF
| 88227 ||  || — || January 19, 2001 || Socorro || LINEAR || L4 || align=right | 19 km || 
|-id=228 bgcolor=#d6d6d6
| 88228 ||  || — || January 19, 2001 || Socorro || LINEAR || — || align=right | 9.1 km || 
|-id=229 bgcolor=#C2FFFF
| 88229 ||  || — || January 19, 2001 || Socorro || LINEAR || L4ERY || align=right | 18 km || 
|-id=230 bgcolor=#d6d6d6
| 88230 ||  || — || January 26, 2001 || Socorro || LINEAR || HIL3:2 || align=right | 19 km || 
|-id=231 bgcolor=#d6d6d6
| 88231 ||  || — || January 29, 2001 || Socorro || LINEAR || THM || align=right | 5.5 km || 
|-id=232 bgcolor=#d6d6d6
| 88232 ||  || — || January 31, 2001 || Socorro || LINEAR || — || align=right | 7.1 km || 
|-id=233 bgcolor=#d6d6d6
| 88233 ||  || — || January 28, 2001 || Haleakala || NEAT || EUP || align=right | 16 km || 
|-id=234 bgcolor=#d6d6d6
| 88234 ||  || — || February 1, 2001 || Socorro || LINEAR || — || align=right | 5.4 km || 
|-id=235 bgcolor=#d6d6d6
| 88235 ||  || — || February 1, 2001 || Socorro || LINEAR || — || align=right | 6.5 km || 
|-id=236 bgcolor=#d6d6d6
| 88236 ||  || — || February 1, 2001 || Socorro || LINEAR || ALA || align=right | 13 km || 
|-id=237 bgcolor=#d6d6d6
| 88237 ||  || — || February 1, 2001 || Socorro || LINEAR || 3:2 || align=right | 11 km || 
|-id=238 bgcolor=#d6d6d6
| 88238 ||  || — || February 2, 2001 || Socorro || LINEAR || — || align=right | 8.2 km || 
|-id=239 bgcolor=#d6d6d6
| 88239 ||  || — || February 2, 2001 || Socorro || LINEAR || — || align=right | 4.7 km || 
|-id=240 bgcolor=#C2FFFF
| 88240 ||  || — || February 2, 2001 || Farpoint || G. Hug || L4 || align=right | 13 km || 
|-id=241 bgcolor=#C2FFFF
| 88241 ||  || — || February 1, 2001 || Anderson Mesa || LONEOS || L4 || align=right | 18 km || 
|-id=242 bgcolor=#fefefe
| 88242 ||  || — || February 2, 2001 || Socorro || LINEAR || Hslow || align=right | 1.6 km || 
|-id=243 bgcolor=#fefefe
| 88243 ||  || — || February 5, 2001 || Socorro || LINEAR || H || align=right | 1.4 km || 
|-id=244 bgcolor=#E9E9E9
| 88244 ||  || — || February 15, 2001 || Višnjan Observatory || K. Korlević || — || align=right | 4.1 km || 
|-id=245 bgcolor=#C2FFFF
| 88245 ||  || — || February 2, 2001 || Cima Ekar || ADAS || L4 || align=right | 11 km || 
|-id=246 bgcolor=#d6d6d6
| 88246 ||  || — || February 17, 2001 || Socorro || LINEAR || 3:2 || align=right | 10 km || 
|-id=247 bgcolor=#d6d6d6
| 88247 ||  || — || February 17, 2001 || Socorro || LINEAR || THM || align=right | 9.3 km || 
|-id=248 bgcolor=#d6d6d6
| 88248 ||  || — || February 16, 2001 || Socorro || LINEAR || — || align=right | 9.4 km || 
|-id=249 bgcolor=#fefefe
| 88249 ||  || — || March 3, 2001 || Socorro || LINEAR || H || align=right | 1.3 km || 
|-id=250 bgcolor=#fefefe
| 88250 ||  || — || March 15, 2001 || Socorro || LINEAR || H || align=right | 1.5 km || 
|-id=251 bgcolor=#fefefe
| 88251 ||  || — || March 20, 2001 || Socorro || LINEAR || H || align=right | 1.6 km || 
|-id=252 bgcolor=#d6d6d6
| 88252 ||  || — || March 18, 2001 || Socorro || LINEAR || — || align=right | 11 km || 
|-id=253 bgcolor=#d6d6d6
| 88253 ||  || — || March 19, 2001 || Socorro || LINEAR || HIL3:2 || align=right | 16 km || 
|-id=254 bgcolor=#FFC2E0
| 88254 ||  || — || March 31, 2001 || Socorro || LINEAR || APO +1kmPHA || align=right data-sort-value="0.8" | 800 m || 
|-id=255 bgcolor=#d6d6d6
| 88255 ||  || — || March 23, 2001 || Anderson Mesa || LONEOS || HYG || align=right | 6.4 km || 
|-id=256 bgcolor=#fefefe
| 88256 ||  || — || March 23, 2001 || Anderson Mesa || LONEOS || H || align=right | 1.2 km || 
|-id=257 bgcolor=#fefefe
| 88257 ||  || — || April 14, 2001 || Socorro || LINEAR || H || align=right | 1.1 km || 
|-id=258 bgcolor=#fefefe
| 88258 ||  || — || April 14, 2001 || Socorro || LINEAR || H || align=right | 1.2 km || 
|-id=259 bgcolor=#fefefe
| 88259 ||  || — || April 21, 2001 || Socorro || LINEAR || H || align=right | 2.0 km || 
|-id=260 bgcolor=#E9E9E9
| 88260 Insubria ||  ||  || April 22, 2001 || Schiaparelli || L. Buzzi, F. Bellini || — || align=right | 2.1 km || 
|-id=261 bgcolor=#fefefe
| 88261 ||  || — || April 27, 2001 || Socorro || LINEAR || — || align=right | 1.5 km || 
|-id=262 bgcolor=#d6d6d6
| 88262 ||  || — || April 29, 2001 || Socorro || LINEAR || THM || align=right | 5.0 km || 
|-id=263 bgcolor=#FFC2E0
| 88263 ||  || — || May 17, 2001 || Socorro || LINEAR || AMO +1km || align=right | 5.7 km || 
|-id=264 bgcolor=#FFC2E0
| 88264 ||  || — || May 22, 2001 || Socorro || LINEAR || AMO +1km || align=right | 1.4 km || 
|-id=265 bgcolor=#fefefe
| 88265 ||  || — || May 22, 2001 || Socorro || LINEAR || PHO || align=right | 2.7 km || 
|-id=266 bgcolor=#fefefe
| 88266 ||  || — || May 24, 2001 || Socorro || LINEAR || — || align=right | 1.9 km || 
|-id=267 bgcolor=#C2E0FF
| 88267 ||  || — || May 22, 2001 || Cerro Tololo || M. W. Buie || cubewano (cold)critical || align=right | 161 km || 
|-id=268 bgcolor=#C2E0FF
| 88268 ||  || — || May 24, 2001 || Cerro Tololo || M. W. Buie || cubewano (cold)critical || align=right | 243 km || 
|-id=269 bgcolor=#C7FF8F
| 88269 ||  || — || May 22, 2001 || Cerro Tololo || M. W. Buie || centaurcritical || align=right | 56 km || 
|-id=270 bgcolor=#E9E9E9
| 88270 ||  || — || May 24, 2001 || Cerro Tololo || M. W. Buie || — || align=right | 2.0 km || 
|-id=271 bgcolor=#E9E9E9
| 88271 ||  || — || June 15, 2001 || Palomar || NEAT || — || align=right | 3.8 km || 
|-id=272 bgcolor=#fefefe
| 88272 ||  || — || June 14, 2001 || Kitt Peak || Spacewatch || — || align=right | 1.6 km || 
|-id=273 bgcolor=#fefefe
| 88273 ||  || — || June 15, 2001 || Socorro || LINEAR || — || align=right | 1.8 km || 
|-id=274 bgcolor=#fefefe
| 88274 ||  || — || June 15, 2001 || Socorro || LINEAR || KLI || align=right | 4.2 km || 
|-id=275 bgcolor=#fefefe
| 88275 ||  || — || June 18, 2001 || Palomar || NEAT || V || align=right | 1.4 km || 
|-id=276 bgcolor=#fefefe
| 88276 ||  || — || June 21, 2001 || Palomar || NEAT || FLO || align=right | 1.6 km || 
|-id=277 bgcolor=#fefefe
| 88277 ||  || — || June 21, 2001 || Palomar || NEAT || V || align=right | 1.4 km || 
|-id=278 bgcolor=#fefefe
| 88278 ||  || — || June 21, 2001 || Palomar || NEAT || V || align=right | 1.9 km || 
|-id=279 bgcolor=#fefefe
| 88279 ||  || — || June 23, 2001 || Palomar || NEAT || — || align=right | 2.3 km || 
|-id=280 bgcolor=#fefefe
| 88280 ||  || — || June 28, 2001 || Anderson Mesa || LONEOS || FLO || align=right | 1.4 km || 
|-id=281 bgcolor=#fefefe
| 88281 ||  || — || June 29, 2001 || Anderson Mesa || LONEOS || — || align=right | 3.1 km || 
|-id=282 bgcolor=#fefefe
| 88282 ||  || — || June 23, 2001 || Palomar || NEAT || NYS || align=right | 1.8 km || 
|-id=283 bgcolor=#fefefe
| 88283 ||  || — || June 25, 2001 || Palomar || NEAT || — || align=right | 1.4 km || 
|-id=284 bgcolor=#fefefe
| 88284 ||  || — || June 27, 2001 || Haleakala || NEAT || NYS || align=right | 1.6 km || 
|-id=285 bgcolor=#fefefe
| 88285 ||  || — || June 27, 2001 || Haleakala || NEAT || — || align=right | 1.9 km || 
|-id=286 bgcolor=#fefefe
| 88286 ||  || — || June 30, 2001 || Haute Provence || Haute-Provence Obs. || FLO || align=right | 1.7 km || 
|-id=287 bgcolor=#fefefe
| 88287 ||  || — || June 16, 2001 || Anderson Mesa || LONEOS || — || align=right | 1.4 km || 
|-id=288 bgcolor=#fefefe
| 88288 ||  || — || June 17, 2001 || Palomar || NEAT || NYS || align=right | 1.7 km || 
|-id=289 bgcolor=#fefefe
| 88289 ||  || — || June 23, 2001 || Palomar || NEAT || FLO || align=right | 4.0 km || 
|-id=290 bgcolor=#fefefe
| 88290 ||  || — || June 24, 2001 || Kitt Peak || Spacewatch || — || align=right | 1.4 km || 
|-id=291 bgcolor=#fefefe
| 88291 ||  || — || June 27, 2001 || Anderson Mesa || LONEOS || FLO || align=right | 1.2 km || 
|-id=292 bgcolor=#fefefe
| 88292 Bora-Bora ||  ||  || July 12, 2001 || Punaauia Obs. || J.-C. Pelle || — || align=right | 1.3 km || 
|-id=293 bgcolor=#fefefe
| 88293 ||  || — || July 13, 2001 || Palomar || NEAT || FLO || align=right | 1.7 km || 
|-id=294 bgcolor=#fefefe
| 88294 ||  || — || July 13, 2001 || Palomar || NEAT || — || align=right | 1.4 km || 
|-id=295 bgcolor=#fefefe
| 88295 ||  || — || July 13, 2001 || Palomar || NEAT || V || align=right | 1.2 km || 
|-id=296 bgcolor=#fefefe
| 88296 ||  || — || July 14, 2001 || Palomar || NEAT || — || align=right | 2.1 km || 
|-id=297 bgcolor=#fefefe
| 88297 Huikilolani ||  ||  || July 11, 2001 || Needville || J. Dellinger, W. G. Dillon || — || align=right | 1.2 km || 
|-id=298 bgcolor=#E9E9E9
| 88298 ||  || — || July 13, 2001 || Palomar || NEAT || GER || align=right | 4.8 km || 
|-id=299 bgcolor=#fefefe
| 88299 ||  || — || July 14, 2001 || Palomar || NEAT || NYS || align=right | 1.8 km || 
|-id=300 bgcolor=#E9E9E9
| 88300 ||  || — || July 14, 2001 || Palomar || NEAT || — || align=right | 4.3 km || 
|}

88301–88400 

|-bgcolor=#fefefe
| 88301 ||  || — || July 17, 2001 || Anderson Mesa || LONEOS || — || align=right | 2.4 km || 
|-id=302 bgcolor=#fefefe
| 88302 ||  || — || July 17, 2001 || Haleakala || NEAT || — || align=right | 1.7 km || 
|-id=303 bgcolor=#fefefe
| 88303 ||  || — || July 17, 2001 || Anderson Mesa || LONEOS || V || align=right | 1.7 km || 
|-id=304 bgcolor=#fefefe
| 88304 ||  || — || July 17, 2001 || Anderson Mesa || LONEOS || NYS || align=right | 4.1 km || 
|-id=305 bgcolor=#fefefe
| 88305 ||  || — || July 17, 2001 || Anderson Mesa || LONEOS || — || align=right | 2.6 km || 
|-id=306 bgcolor=#fefefe
| 88306 ||  || — || July 17, 2001 || Anderson Mesa || LONEOS || FLO || align=right | 1.5 km || 
|-id=307 bgcolor=#fefefe
| 88307 ||  || — || July 18, 2001 || Haleakala || NEAT || V || align=right | 1.3 km || 
|-id=308 bgcolor=#fefefe
| 88308 ||  || — || July 20, 2001 || Socorro || LINEAR || NYS || align=right | 1.7 km || 
|-id=309 bgcolor=#E9E9E9
| 88309 ||  || — || July 17, 2001 || Palomar || NEAT || — || align=right | 1.3 km || 
|-id=310 bgcolor=#fefefe
| 88310 ||  || — || July 17, 2001 || Haleakala || NEAT || FLO || align=right | 2.5 km || 
|-id=311 bgcolor=#fefefe
| 88311 ||  || — || July 17, 2001 || Haleakala || NEAT || V || align=right | 1.3 km || 
|-id=312 bgcolor=#fefefe
| 88312 ||  || — || July 21, 2001 || Anderson Mesa || LONEOS || — || align=right | 1.6 km || 
|-id=313 bgcolor=#fefefe
| 88313 ||  || — || July 21, 2001 || Anderson Mesa || LONEOS || FLO || align=right | 1.6 km || 
|-id=314 bgcolor=#fefefe
| 88314 ||  || — || July 19, 2001 || Palomar || NEAT || — || align=right | 1.5 km || 
|-id=315 bgcolor=#fefefe
| 88315 ||  || — || July 19, 2001 || Palomar || NEAT || V || align=right | 1.2 km || 
|-id=316 bgcolor=#fefefe
| 88316 ||  || — || July 20, 2001 || Palomar || NEAT || — || align=right | 1.5 km || 
|-id=317 bgcolor=#fefefe
| 88317 ||  || — || July 20, 2001 || Palomar || NEAT || V || align=right | 1.2 km || 
|-id=318 bgcolor=#E9E9E9
| 88318 ||  || — || July 20, 2001 || Palomar || NEAT || — || align=right | 3.1 km || 
|-id=319 bgcolor=#fefefe
| 88319 ||  || — || July 22, 2001 || Palomar || NEAT || — || align=right | 1.8 km || 
|-id=320 bgcolor=#fefefe
| 88320 ||  || — || July 22, 2001 || Palomar || NEAT || — || align=right | 1.5 km || 
|-id=321 bgcolor=#fefefe
| 88321 ||  || — || July 23, 2001 || Palomar || NEAT || — || align=right | 1.5 km || 
|-id=322 bgcolor=#fefefe
| 88322 ||  || — || July 23, 2001 || Palomar || NEAT || — || align=right | 1.8 km || 
|-id=323 bgcolor=#fefefe
| 88323 ||  || — || July 16, 2001 || Anderson Mesa || LONEOS || — || align=right | 2.4 km || 
|-id=324 bgcolor=#fefefe
| 88324 ||  || — || July 16, 2001 || Anderson Mesa || LONEOS || FLO || align=right | 1.2 km || 
|-id=325 bgcolor=#fefefe
| 88325 ||  || — || July 16, 2001 || Anderson Mesa || LONEOS || FLO || align=right | 1.3 km || 
|-id=326 bgcolor=#fefefe
| 88326 ||  || — || July 21, 2001 || Palomar || NEAT || V || align=right | 1.6 km || 
|-id=327 bgcolor=#d6d6d6
| 88327 ||  || — || July 21, 2001 || Palomar || NEAT || SAN || align=right | 4.2 km || 
|-id=328 bgcolor=#fefefe
| 88328 ||  || — || July 26, 2001 || Palomar || NEAT || V || align=right | 1.9 km || 
|-id=329 bgcolor=#E9E9E9
| 88329 ||  || — || July 19, 2001 || Palomar || NEAT || — || align=right | 2.2 km || 
|-id=330 bgcolor=#fefefe
| 88330 ||  || — || July 19, 2001 || Palomar || NEAT || — || align=right | 1.6 km || 
|-id=331 bgcolor=#fefefe
| 88331 ||  || — || July 20, 2001 || Socorro || LINEAR || — || align=right | 2.4 km || 
|-id=332 bgcolor=#fefefe
| 88332 ||  || — || July 21, 2001 || Haleakala || NEAT || — || align=right | 1.3 km || 
|-id=333 bgcolor=#fefefe
| 88333 ||  || — || July 21, 2001 || Haleakala || NEAT || NYS || align=right | 3.3 km || 
|-id=334 bgcolor=#fefefe
| 88334 ||  || — || July 24, 2001 || Haleakala || NEAT || — || align=right | 1.9 km || 
|-id=335 bgcolor=#d6d6d6
| 88335 ||  || — || July 22, 2001 || Palomar || NEAT || — || align=right | 9.3 km || 
|-id=336 bgcolor=#fefefe
| 88336 ||  || — || July 16, 2001 || Anderson Mesa || LONEOS || — || align=right | 4.2 km || 
|-id=337 bgcolor=#fefefe
| 88337 ||  || — || July 16, 2001 || Anderson Mesa || LONEOS || NYS || align=right | 1.7 km || 
|-id=338 bgcolor=#fefefe
| 88338 ||  || — || July 16, 2001 || Haleakala || NEAT || V || align=right | 1.6 km || 
|-id=339 bgcolor=#fefefe
| 88339 ||  || — || July 19, 2001 || Anderson Mesa || LONEOS || NYS || align=right | 1.7 km || 
|-id=340 bgcolor=#fefefe
| 88340 ||  || — || July 19, 2001 || Anderson Mesa || LONEOS || — || align=right | 1.7 km || 
|-id=341 bgcolor=#fefefe
| 88341 ||  || — || July 19, 2001 || Anderson Mesa || LONEOS || NYS || align=right | 1.6 km || 
|-id=342 bgcolor=#fefefe
| 88342 ||  || — || July 19, 2001 || Anderson Mesa || LONEOS || — || align=right | 1.9 km || 
|-id=343 bgcolor=#fefefe
| 88343 ||  || — || July 19, 2001 || Palomar || NEAT || — || align=right | 1.9 km || 
|-id=344 bgcolor=#fefefe
| 88344 ||  || — || July 21, 2001 || Anderson Mesa || LONEOS || MAS || align=right | 1.6 km || 
|-id=345 bgcolor=#fefefe
| 88345 ||  || — || July 21, 2001 || Anderson Mesa || LONEOS || — || align=right | 2.1 km || 
|-id=346 bgcolor=#fefefe
| 88346 ||  || — || July 21, 2001 || Anderson Mesa || LONEOS || V || align=right | 1.3 km || 
|-id=347 bgcolor=#fefefe
| 88347 ||  || — || July 21, 2001 || Kitt Peak || Spacewatch || FLO || align=right | 1.2 km || 
|-id=348 bgcolor=#fefefe
| 88348 ||  || — || July 24, 2001 || Palomar || NEAT || — || align=right | 2.0 km || 
|-id=349 bgcolor=#E9E9E9
| 88349 ||  || — || July 25, 2001 || Haleakala || NEAT || — || align=right | 5.8 km || 
|-id=350 bgcolor=#E9E9E9
| 88350 ||  || — || July 27, 2001 || Palomar || NEAT || — || align=right | 3.0 km || 
|-id=351 bgcolor=#fefefe
| 88351 ||  || — || July 27, 2001 || Palomar || NEAT || — || align=right | 1.7 km || 
|-id=352 bgcolor=#fefefe
| 88352 ||  || — || July 22, 2001 || Socorro || LINEAR || V || align=right | 1.6 km || 
|-id=353 bgcolor=#fefefe
| 88353 ||  || — || July 21, 2001 || Haleakala || NEAT || NYS || align=right | 1.5 km || 
|-id=354 bgcolor=#fefefe
| 88354 ||  || — || July 23, 2001 || Palomar || NEAT || V || align=right | 1.8 km || 
|-id=355 bgcolor=#fefefe
| 88355 ||  || — || July 27, 2001 || Anderson Mesa || LONEOS || — || align=right | 1.2 km || 
|-id=356 bgcolor=#fefefe
| 88356 ||  || — || July 27, 2001 || Anderson Mesa || LONEOS || V || align=right | 1.6 km || 
|-id=357 bgcolor=#fefefe
| 88357 ||  || — || July 27, 2001 || Anderson Mesa || LONEOS || — || align=right | 1.2 km || 
|-id=358 bgcolor=#fefefe
| 88358 ||  || — || July 27, 2001 || Anderson Mesa || LONEOS || — || align=right | 2.1 km || 
|-id=359 bgcolor=#E9E9E9
| 88359 ||  || — || July 27, 2001 || Palomar || NEAT || — || align=right | 3.8 km || 
|-id=360 bgcolor=#fefefe
| 88360 ||  || — || July 29, 2001 || Anderson Mesa || LONEOS || — || align=right | 5.3 km || 
|-id=361 bgcolor=#E9E9E9
| 88361 ||  || — || July 30, 2001 || Socorro || LINEAR || — || align=right | 5.3 km || 
|-id=362 bgcolor=#fefefe
| 88362 ||  || — || July 29, 2001 || Socorro || LINEAR || — || align=right | 1.8 km || 
|-id=363 bgcolor=#fefefe
| 88363 ||  || — || July 29, 2001 || Socorro || LINEAR || — || align=right | 2.5 km || 
|-id=364 bgcolor=#fefefe
| 88364 || 2001 PK || — || August 5, 2001 || Haleakala || NEAT || — || align=right | 1.6 km || 
|-id=365 bgcolor=#fefefe
| 88365 ||  || — || August 3, 2001 || Haleakala || NEAT || — || align=right | 2.0 km || 
|-id=366 bgcolor=#fefefe
| 88366 ||  || — || August 10, 2001 || Haleakala || NEAT || — || align=right | 1.8 km || 
|-id=367 bgcolor=#fefefe
| 88367 ||  || — || August 11, 2001 || Haleakala || NEAT || V || align=right | 1.9 km || 
|-id=368 bgcolor=#fefefe
| 88368 ||  || — || August 11, 2001 || Ametlla de Mar || J. Nomen || — || align=right | 1.8 km || 
|-id=369 bgcolor=#fefefe
| 88369 ||  || — || August 11, 2001 || Palomar || NEAT || — || align=right | 2.1 km || 
|-id=370 bgcolor=#fefefe
| 88370 ||  || — || August 15, 2001 || Ametlla de Mar || J. Nomen || FLO || align=right | 1.5 km || 
|-id=371 bgcolor=#fefefe
| 88371 ||  || — || August 14, 2001 || San Marcello || A. Boattini, M. Tombelli || NYS || align=right | 1.5 km || 
|-id=372 bgcolor=#fefefe
| 88372 ||  || — || August 9, 2001 || Palomar || NEAT || — || align=right | 1.3 km || 
|-id=373 bgcolor=#fefefe
| 88373 ||  || — || August 10, 2001 || Haleakala || NEAT || V || align=right | 1.6 km || 
|-id=374 bgcolor=#E9E9E9
| 88374 ||  || — || August 10, 2001 || Haleakala || NEAT || — || align=right | 4.7 km || 
|-id=375 bgcolor=#fefefe
| 88375 ||  || — || August 11, 2001 || Haleakala || NEAT || — || align=right | 1.8 km || 
|-id=376 bgcolor=#fefefe
| 88376 ||  || — || August 11, 2001 || Haleakala || NEAT || — || align=right | 1.7 km || 
|-id=377 bgcolor=#E9E9E9
| 88377 ||  || — || August 15, 2001 || Emerald Lane || L. Ball || MRX || align=right | 1.9 km || 
|-id=378 bgcolor=#fefefe
| 88378 ||  || — || August 10, 2001 || Palomar || NEAT || — || align=right | 1.5 km || 
|-id=379 bgcolor=#E9E9E9
| 88379 ||  || — || August 10, 2001 || Palomar || NEAT || — || align=right | 5.2 km || 
|-id=380 bgcolor=#E9E9E9
| 88380 ||  || — || August 11, 2001 || Palomar || NEAT || GEF || align=right | 6.8 km || 
|-id=381 bgcolor=#fefefe
| 88381 ||  || — || August 14, 2001 || Haleakala || NEAT || FLO || align=right | 1.1 km || 
|-id=382 bgcolor=#E9E9E9
| 88382 ||  || — || August 13, 2001 || Palomar || NEAT || — || align=right | 3.7 km || 
|-id=383 bgcolor=#E9E9E9
| 88383 ||  || — || August 14, 2001 || Haleakala || NEAT || — || align=right | 6.8 km || 
|-id=384 bgcolor=#fefefe
| 88384 ||  || — || August 13, 2001 || Haleakala || NEAT || V || align=right | 1.1 km || 
|-id=385 bgcolor=#E9E9E9
| 88385 ||  || — || August 13, 2001 || Haleakala || NEAT || HNS || align=right | 2.7 km || 
|-id=386 bgcolor=#fefefe
| 88386 ||  || — || August 13, 2001 || Haleakala || NEAT || NYS || align=right | 1.5 km || 
|-id=387 bgcolor=#fefefe
| 88387 || 2001 QT || — || August 16, 2001 || Socorro || LINEAR || — || align=right | 1.6 km || 
|-id=388 bgcolor=#E9E9E9
| 88388 ||  || — || August 16, 2001 || Prescott || P. G. Comba || — || align=right | 2.2 km || 
|-id=389 bgcolor=#E9E9E9
| 88389 ||  || — || August 16, 2001 || Socorro || LINEAR || — || align=right | 3.4 km || 
|-id=390 bgcolor=#fefefe
| 88390 ||  || — || August 16, 2001 || Socorro || LINEAR || — || align=right | 3.0 km || 
|-id=391 bgcolor=#fefefe
| 88391 ||  || — || August 16, 2001 || Socorro || LINEAR || V || align=right | 1.6 km || 
|-id=392 bgcolor=#fefefe
| 88392 ||  || — || August 16, 2001 || Socorro || LINEAR || NYS || align=right | 4.6 km || 
|-id=393 bgcolor=#E9E9E9
| 88393 ||  || — || August 16, 2001 || Socorro || LINEAR || — || align=right | 4.5 km || 
|-id=394 bgcolor=#fefefe
| 88394 ||  || — || August 16, 2001 || Socorro || LINEAR || — || align=right | 1.8 km || 
|-id=395 bgcolor=#fefefe
| 88395 ||  || — || August 16, 2001 || Socorro || LINEAR || NYS || align=right | 1.8 km || 
|-id=396 bgcolor=#E9E9E9
| 88396 ||  || — || August 16, 2001 || Socorro || LINEAR || — || align=right | 2.0 km || 
|-id=397 bgcolor=#fefefe
| 88397 ||  || — || August 16, 2001 || Socorro || LINEAR || — || align=right | 1.9 km || 
|-id=398 bgcolor=#E9E9E9
| 88398 ||  || — || August 16, 2001 || Socorro || LINEAR || — || align=right | 4.1 km || 
|-id=399 bgcolor=#fefefe
| 88399 ||  || — || August 16, 2001 || Socorro || LINEAR || — || align=right | 1.6 km || 
|-id=400 bgcolor=#E9E9E9
| 88400 ||  || — || August 16, 2001 || Socorro || LINEAR || — || align=right | 2.0 km || 
|}

88401–88500 

|-bgcolor=#fefefe
| 88401 ||  || — || August 16, 2001 || Socorro || LINEAR || — || align=right | 1.6 km || 
|-id=402 bgcolor=#E9E9E9
| 88402 ||  || — || August 16, 2001 || Socorro || LINEAR || DOR || align=right | 5.2 km || 
|-id=403 bgcolor=#fefefe
| 88403 ||  || — || August 16, 2001 || Socorro || LINEAR || — || align=right | 1.7 km || 
|-id=404 bgcolor=#fefefe
| 88404 ||  || — || August 16, 2001 || Socorro || LINEAR || NYS || align=right | 1.5 km || 
|-id=405 bgcolor=#E9E9E9
| 88405 ||  || — || August 16, 2001 || Socorro || LINEAR || EUN || align=right | 3.6 km || 
|-id=406 bgcolor=#fefefe
| 88406 ||  || — || August 16, 2001 || Socorro || LINEAR || NYS || align=right | 1.8 km || 
|-id=407 bgcolor=#d6d6d6
| 88407 ||  || — || August 16, 2001 || Socorro || LINEAR || — || align=right | 5.9 km || 
|-id=408 bgcolor=#fefefe
| 88408 ||  || — || August 16, 2001 || Socorro || LINEAR || NYS || align=right | 1.6 km || 
|-id=409 bgcolor=#fefefe
| 88409 ||  || — || August 16, 2001 || Socorro || LINEAR || FLO || align=right | 1.5 km || 
|-id=410 bgcolor=#fefefe
| 88410 ||  || — || August 16, 2001 || Socorro || LINEAR || — || align=right | 2.1 km || 
|-id=411 bgcolor=#fefefe
| 88411 ||  || — || August 16, 2001 || Socorro || LINEAR || FLO || align=right | 1.3 km || 
|-id=412 bgcolor=#FA8072
| 88412 ||  || — || August 16, 2001 || Socorro || LINEAR || — || align=right | 1.5 km || 
|-id=413 bgcolor=#E9E9E9
| 88413 ||  || — || August 16, 2001 || Socorro || LINEAR || — || align=right | 4.5 km || 
|-id=414 bgcolor=#fefefe
| 88414 ||  || — || August 17, 2001 || Socorro || LINEAR || — || align=right | 1.5 km || 
|-id=415 bgcolor=#fefefe
| 88415 ||  || — || August 17, 2001 || Palomar || NEAT || — || align=right | 2.3 km || 
|-id=416 bgcolor=#fefefe
| 88416 ||  || — || August 16, 2001 || Socorro || LINEAR || — || align=right | 1.9 km || 
|-id=417 bgcolor=#E9E9E9
| 88417 ||  || — || August 16, 2001 || Socorro || LINEAR || — || align=right | 2.3 km || 
|-id=418 bgcolor=#E9E9E9
| 88418 ||  || — || August 16, 2001 || Socorro || LINEAR || MIS || align=right | 5.0 km || 
|-id=419 bgcolor=#fefefe
| 88419 ||  || — || August 16, 2001 || Socorro || LINEAR || — || align=right | 1.4 km || 
|-id=420 bgcolor=#fefefe
| 88420 ||  || — || August 16, 2001 || Socorro || LINEAR || NYS || align=right | 1.6 km || 
|-id=421 bgcolor=#fefefe
| 88421 ||  || — || August 16, 2001 || Socorro || LINEAR || — || align=right | 1.5 km || 
|-id=422 bgcolor=#fefefe
| 88422 ||  || — || August 16, 2001 || Socorro || LINEAR || NYS || align=right | 1.3 km || 
|-id=423 bgcolor=#d6d6d6
| 88423 ||  || — || August 18, 2001 || Socorro || LINEAR || — || align=right | 4.4 km || 
|-id=424 bgcolor=#FA8072
| 88424 ||  || — || August 19, 2001 || Socorro || LINEAR || — || align=right | 1.9 km || 
|-id=425 bgcolor=#fefefe
| 88425 ||  || — || August 16, 2001 || Socorro || LINEAR || V || align=right | 1.4 km || 
|-id=426 bgcolor=#E9E9E9
| 88426 ||  || — || August 16, 2001 || Socorro || LINEAR || — || align=right | 6.1 km || 
|-id=427 bgcolor=#fefefe
| 88427 ||  || — || August 16, 2001 || Socorro || LINEAR || NYS || align=right | 1.6 km || 
|-id=428 bgcolor=#fefefe
| 88428 ||  || — || August 16, 2001 || Socorro || LINEAR || — || align=right | 1.6 km || 
|-id=429 bgcolor=#fefefe
| 88429 ||  || — || August 16, 2001 || Socorro || LINEAR || FLO || align=right | 1.4 km || 
|-id=430 bgcolor=#fefefe
| 88430 ||  || — || August 16, 2001 || Socorro || LINEAR || — || align=right | 1.8 km || 
|-id=431 bgcolor=#fefefe
| 88431 ||  || — || August 17, 2001 || Socorro || LINEAR || V || align=right | 1.4 km || 
|-id=432 bgcolor=#fefefe
| 88432 ||  || — || August 20, 2001 || Oakley || C. Wolfe || — || align=right | 3.1 km || 
|-id=433 bgcolor=#fefefe
| 88433 ||  || — || August 20, 2001 || Oakley || C. Wolfe || — || align=right | 2.2 km || 
|-id=434 bgcolor=#fefefe
| 88434 ||  || — || August 17, 2001 || Socorro || LINEAR || FLO || align=right | 1.4 km || 
|-id=435 bgcolor=#E9E9E9
| 88435 ||  || — || August 17, 2001 || Socorro || LINEAR || MAR || align=right | 3.2 km || 
|-id=436 bgcolor=#fefefe
| 88436 ||  || — || August 17, 2001 || Socorro || LINEAR || V || align=right | 1.9 km || 
|-id=437 bgcolor=#fefefe
| 88437 ||  || — || August 17, 2001 || Socorro || LINEAR || V || align=right | 1.7 km || 
|-id=438 bgcolor=#fefefe
| 88438 ||  || — || August 17, 2001 || Socorro || LINEAR || V || align=right | 1.3 km || 
|-id=439 bgcolor=#fefefe
| 88439 ||  || — || August 16, 2001 || Socorro || LINEAR || FLO || align=right | 1.7 km || 
|-id=440 bgcolor=#E9E9E9
| 88440 ||  || — || August 16, 2001 || Socorro || LINEAR || HEN || align=right | 2.9 km || 
|-id=441 bgcolor=#E9E9E9
| 88441 ||  || — || August 16, 2001 || Socorro || LINEAR || — || align=right | 4.9 km || 
|-id=442 bgcolor=#fefefe
| 88442 ||  || — || August 16, 2001 || Socorro || LINEAR || NYS || align=right | 1.9 km || 
|-id=443 bgcolor=#fefefe
| 88443 ||  || — || August 16, 2001 || Socorro || LINEAR || V || align=right | 1.7 km || 
|-id=444 bgcolor=#E9E9E9
| 88444 ||  || — || August 16, 2001 || Socorro || LINEAR || — || align=right | 3.2 km || 
|-id=445 bgcolor=#fefefe
| 88445 ||  || — || August 16, 2001 || Socorro || LINEAR || NYS || align=right | 2.1 km || 
|-id=446 bgcolor=#E9E9E9
| 88446 ||  || — || August 17, 2001 || Socorro || LINEAR || EUN || align=right | 3.7 km || 
|-id=447 bgcolor=#fefefe
| 88447 ||  || — || August 17, 2001 || Socorro || LINEAR || — || align=right | 2.0 km || 
|-id=448 bgcolor=#fefefe
| 88448 ||  || — || August 17, 2001 || Socorro || LINEAR || — || align=right | 4.0 km || 
|-id=449 bgcolor=#fefefe
| 88449 ||  || — || August 17, 2001 || Socorro || LINEAR || — || align=right | 2.0 km || 
|-id=450 bgcolor=#fefefe
| 88450 ||  || — || August 17, 2001 || Socorro || LINEAR || — || align=right | 1.9 km || 
|-id=451 bgcolor=#E9E9E9
| 88451 ||  || — || August 17, 2001 || Palomar || NEAT || — || align=right | 2.3 km || 
|-id=452 bgcolor=#E9E9E9
| 88452 ||  || — || August 20, 2001 || Palomar || NEAT || — || align=right | 4.8 km || 
|-id=453 bgcolor=#FA8072
| 88453 ||  || — || August 23, 2001 || Palomar || NEAT || — || align=right | 2.0 km || 
|-id=454 bgcolor=#E9E9E9
| 88454 ||  || — || August 19, 2001 || Socorro || LINEAR || — || align=right | 2.6 km || 
|-id=455 bgcolor=#E9E9E9
| 88455 ||  || — || August 23, 2001 || Desert Eagle || W. K. Y. Yeung || — || align=right | 2.6 km || 
|-id=456 bgcolor=#d6d6d6
| 88456 ||  || — || August 23, 2001 || Desert Eagle || W. K. Y. Yeung || THM || align=right | 5.9 km || 
|-id=457 bgcolor=#fefefe
| 88457 ||  || — || August 23, 2001 || Desert Eagle || W. K. Y. Yeung || FLO || align=right | 1.2 km || 
|-id=458 bgcolor=#E9E9E9
| 88458 ||  || — || August 22, 2001 || Kitt Peak || Spacewatch || — || align=right | 2.6 km || 
|-id=459 bgcolor=#fefefe
| 88459 ||  || — || August 22, 2001 || Kitt Peak || Spacewatch || — || align=right | 1.7 km || 
|-id=460 bgcolor=#fefefe
| 88460 ||  || — || August 17, 2001 || Socorro || LINEAR || — || align=right | 2.0 km || 
|-id=461 bgcolor=#fefefe
| 88461 ||  || — || August 19, 2001 || Socorro || LINEAR || NYS || align=right | 3.8 km || 
|-id=462 bgcolor=#fefefe
| 88462 ||  || — || August 22, 2001 || Socorro || LINEAR || — || align=right | 4.1 km || 
|-id=463 bgcolor=#fefefe
| 88463 ||  || — || August 18, 2001 || Socorro || LINEAR || FLO || align=right | 1.3 km || 
|-id=464 bgcolor=#fefefe
| 88464 ||  || — || August 18, 2001 || Socorro || LINEAR || NYS || align=right | 1.7 km || 
|-id=465 bgcolor=#E9E9E9
| 88465 ||  || — || August 18, 2001 || Anderson Mesa || LONEOS || — || align=right | 3.9 km || 
|-id=466 bgcolor=#E9E9E9
| 88466 ||  || — || August 18, 2001 || Anderson Mesa || LONEOS || HNS || align=right | 2.9 km || 
|-id=467 bgcolor=#E9E9E9
| 88467 ||  || — || August 25, 2001 || Ametlla de Mar || J. Nomen || — || align=right | 3.7 km || 
|-id=468 bgcolor=#fefefe
| 88468 ||  || — || August 19, 2001 || Haleakala || NEAT || — || align=right | 1.9 km || 
|-id=469 bgcolor=#fefefe
| 88469 ||  || — || August 20, 2001 || Palomar || NEAT || H || align=right | 2.1 km || 
|-id=470 bgcolor=#E9E9E9
| 88470 Joaquinescrig ||  ||  || August 26, 2001 || Pla D'Arguines || R. Ferrando || — || align=right | 3.0 km || 
|-id=471 bgcolor=#E9E9E9
| 88471 ||  || — || August 26, 2001 || Farpoint || Farpoint Obs. || — || align=right | 1.9 km || 
|-id=472 bgcolor=#E9E9E9
| 88472 ||  || — || August 22, 2001 || Socorro || LINEAR || MAR || align=right | 5.0 km || 
|-id=473 bgcolor=#d6d6d6
| 88473 ||  || — || August 23, 2001 || Socorro || LINEAR || — || align=right | 5.4 km || 
|-id=474 bgcolor=#fefefe
| 88474 ||  || — || August 24, 2001 || Socorro || LINEAR || — || align=right | 2.0 km || 
|-id=475 bgcolor=#E9E9E9
| 88475 ||  || — || August 25, 2001 || Socorro || LINEAR || — || align=right | 2.0 km || 
|-id=476 bgcolor=#fefefe
| 88476 ||  || — || August 17, 2001 || Socorro || LINEAR || V || align=right | 1.3 km || 
|-id=477 bgcolor=#E9E9E9
| 88477 ||  || — || August 17, 2001 || Socorro || LINEAR || — || align=right | 4.3 km || 
|-id=478 bgcolor=#fefefe
| 88478 ||  || — || August 17, 2001 || Socorro || LINEAR || V || align=right | 1.4 km || 
|-id=479 bgcolor=#fefefe
| 88479 ||  || — || August 18, 2001 || Socorro || LINEAR || NYS || align=right | 1.3 km || 
|-id=480 bgcolor=#fefefe
| 88480 ||  || — || August 18, 2001 || Socorro || LINEAR || V || align=right | 1.5 km || 
|-id=481 bgcolor=#fefefe
| 88481 ||  || — || August 19, 2001 || Socorro || LINEAR || — || align=right | 1.5 km || 
|-id=482 bgcolor=#E9E9E9
| 88482 ||  || — || August 19, 2001 || Socorro || LINEAR || — || align=right | 2.5 km || 
|-id=483 bgcolor=#fefefe
| 88483 ||  || — || August 19, 2001 || Socorro || LINEAR || FLO || align=right | 1.3 km || 
|-id=484 bgcolor=#E9E9E9
| 88484 ||  || — || August 20, 2001 || Socorro || LINEAR || — || align=right | 2.7 km || 
|-id=485 bgcolor=#fefefe
| 88485 ||  || — || August 20, 2001 || Socorro || LINEAR || V || align=right | 1.5 km || 
|-id=486 bgcolor=#fefefe
| 88486 ||  || — || August 20, 2001 || Socorro || LINEAR || V || align=right | 1.3 km || 
|-id=487 bgcolor=#fefefe
| 88487 ||  || — || August 20, 2001 || Socorro || LINEAR || — || align=right | 2.0 km || 
|-id=488 bgcolor=#E9E9E9
| 88488 ||  || — || August 20, 2001 || Socorro || LINEAR || — || align=right | 4.2 km || 
|-id=489 bgcolor=#fefefe
| 88489 ||  || — || August 20, 2001 || Socorro || LINEAR || — || align=right | 1.7 km || 
|-id=490 bgcolor=#fefefe
| 88490 ||  || — || August 20, 2001 || Socorro || LINEAR || — || align=right | 4.2 km || 
|-id=491 bgcolor=#fefefe
| 88491 ||  || — || August 22, 2001 || Socorro || LINEAR || — || align=right | 2.0 km || 
|-id=492 bgcolor=#E9E9E9
| 88492 ||  || — || August 22, 2001 || Socorro || LINEAR || — || align=right | 7.8 km || 
|-id=493 bgcolor=#fefefe
| 88493 ||  || — || August 22, 2001 || Socorro || LINEAR || FLO || align=right | 1.6 km || 
|-id=494 bgcolor=#fefefe
| 88494 ||  || — || August 22, 2001 || Socorro || LINEAR || V || align=right | 3.1 km || 
|-id=495 bgcolor=#E9E9E9
| 88495 ||  || — || August 22, 2001 || Socorro || LINEAR || — || align=right | 2.3 km || 
|-id=496 bgcolor=#E9E9E9
| 88496 ||  || — || August 22, 2001 || Socorro || LINEAR || — || align=right | 3.2 km || 
|-id=497 bgcolor=#d6d6d6
| 88497 ||  || — || August 22, 2001 || Socorro || LINEAR || EOS || align=right | 5.3 km || 
|-id=498 bgcolor=#d6d6d6
| 88498 ||  || — || August 22, 2001 || Socorro || LINEAR || — || align=right | 5.9 km || 
|-id=499 bgcolor=#d6d6d6
| 88499 ||  || — || August 22, 2001 || Socorro || LINEAR || — || align=right | 7.5 km || 
|-id=500 bgcolor=#fefefe
| 88500 ||  || — || August 22, 2001 || Socorro || LINEAR || — || align=right | 6.1 km || 
|}

88501–88600 

|-bgcolor=#fefefe
| 88501 ||  || — || August 22, 2001 || Socorro || LINEAR || KLI || align=right | 4.7 km || 
|-id=502 bgcolor=#fefefe
| 88502 ||  || — || August 22, 2001 || Socorro || LINEAR || — || align=right | 5.1 km || 
|-id=503 bgcolor=#E9E9E9
| 88503 ||  || — || August 22, 2001 || Socorro || LINEAR || — || align=right | 5.2 km || 
|-id=504 bgcolor=#fefefe
| 88504 ||  || — || August 22, 2001 || Socorro || LINEAR || V || align=right | 2.1 km || 
|-id=505 bgcolor=#fefefe
| 88505 ||  || — || August 22, 2001 || Socorro || LINEAR || — || align=right | 2.6 km || 
|-id=506 bgcolor=#fefefe
| 88506 ||  || — || August 22, 2001 || Socorro || LINEAR || — || align=right | 2.7 km || 
|-id=507 bgcolor=#fefefe
| 88507 ||  || — || August 24, 2001 || Socorro || LINEAR || FLO || align=right | 2.1 km || 
|-id=508 bgcolor=#fefefe
| 88508 ||  || — || August 21, 2001 || Kitt Peak || Spacewatch || — || align=right | 1.8 km || 
|-id=509 bgcolor=#E9E9E9
| 88509 ||  || — || August 22, 2001 || Haleakala || NEAT || — || align=right | 6.5 km || 
|-id=510 bgcolor=#E9E9E9
| 88510 ||  || — || August 25, 2001 || Palomar || NEAT || — || align=right | 3.4 km || 
|-id=511 bgcolor=#E9E9E9
| 88511 ||  || — || August 24, 2001 || Goodricke-Pigott || R. A. Tucker || — || align=right | 4.7 km || 
|-id=512 bgcolor=#fefefe
| 88512 ||  || — || August 25, 2001 || Goodricke-Pigott || R. A. Tucker || — || align=right | 1.8 km || 
|-id=513 bgcolor=#E9E9E9
| 88513 ||  || — || August 23, 2001 || Anderson Mesa || LONEOS || — || align=right | 2.7 km || 
|-id=514 bgcolor=#fefefe
| 88514 ||  || — || August 23, 2001 || Anderson Mesa || LONEOS || — || align=right | 1.9 km || 
|-id=515 bgcolor=#fefefe
| 88515 ||  || — || August 23, 2001 || Anderson Mesa || LONEOS || V || align=right | 1.4 km || 
|-id=516 bgcolor=#fefefe
| 88516 ||  || — || August 23, 2001 || Anderson Mesa || LONEOS || MAS || align=right | 1.2 km || 
|-id=517 bgcolor=#E9E9E9
| 88517 ||  || — || August 23, 2001 || Anderson Mesa || LONEOS || — || align=right | 2.0 km || 
|-id=518 bgcolor=#fefefe
| 88518 ||  || — || August 23, 2001 || Anderson Mesa || LONEOS || NYS || align=right | 1.1 km || 
|-id=519 bgcolor=#d6d6d6
| 88519 ||  || — || August 31, 2001 || Desert Eagle || W. K. Y. Yeung || — || align=right | 5.5 km || 
|-id=520 bgcolor=#E9E9E9
| 88520 ||  || — || August 24, 2001 || Haleakala || NEAT || — || align=right | 2.7 km || 
|-id=521 bgcolor=#d6d6d6
| 88521 ||  || — || August 25, 2001 || Palomar || NEAT || — || align=right | 5.2 km || 
|-id=522 bgcolor=#E9E9E9
| 88522 ||  || — || August 25, 2001 || Socorro || LINEAR || RAF || align=right | 1.8 km || 
|-id=523 bgcolor=#E9E9E9
| 88523 ||  || — || August 24, 2001 || Socorro || LINEAR || HEN || align=right | 1.9 km || 
|-id=524 bgcolor=#fefefe
| 88524 ||  || — || August 27, 2001 || Socorro || LINEAR || V || align=right | 1.5 km || 
|-id=525 bgcolor=#E9E9E9
| 88525 ||  || — || August 25, 2001 || Goodricke-Pigott || R. A. Tucker || — || align=right | 2.5 km || 
|-id=526 bgcolor=#E9E9E9
| 88526 ||  || — || August 23, 2001 || Kitt Peak || Spacewatch || HEN || align=right | 1.5 km || 
|-id=527 bgcolor=#fefefe
| 88527 ||  || — || August 25, 2001 || Palomar || NEAT || V || align=right | 1.5 km || 
|-id=528 bgcolor=#E9E9E9
| 88528 ||  || — || August 25, 2001 || Palomar || NEAT || — || align=right | 6.0 km || 
|-id=529 bgcolor=#fefefe
| 88529 ||  || — || August 25, 2001 || Palomar || NEAT || — || align=right | 1.9 km || 
|-id=530 bgcolor=#fefefe
| 88530 ||  || — || August 25, 2001 || Palomar || NEAT || — || align=right | 1.5 km || 
|-id=531 bgcolor=#fefefe
| 88531 ||  || — || August 25, 2001 || Palomar || NEAT || V || align=right | 1.3 km || 
|-id=532 bgcolor=#fefefe
| 88532 ||  || — || August 31, 2001 || Palomar || NEAT || V || align=right | 2.5 km || 
|-id=533 bgcolor=#E9E9E9
| 88533 ||  || — || August 23, 2001 || Palomar || NEAT || — || align=right | 4.4 km || 
|-id=534 bgcolor=#d6d6d6
| 88534 ||  || — || August 22, 2001 || Bergisch Gladbach || W. Bickel || — || align=right | 6.2 km || 
|-id=535 bgcolor=#fefefe
| 88535 ||  || — || August 28, 2001 || Bergisch Gladbach || W. Bickel || FLO || align=right | 2.0 km || 
|-id=536 bgcolor=#fefefe
| 88536 ||  || — || August 21, 2001 || Socorro || LINEAR || — || align=right | 3.4 km || 
|-id=537 bgcolor=#fefefe
| 88537 ||  || — || August 21, 2001 || Socorro || LINEAR || KLI || align=right | 4.5 km || 
|-id=538 bgcolor=#E9E9E9
| 88538 ||  || — || August 21, 2001 || Palomar || NEAT || HNS || align=right | 2.9 km || 
|-id=539 bgcolor=#E9E9E9
| 88539 ||  || — || August 22, 2001 || Kitt Peak || Spacewatch || ADE || align=right | 4.3 km || 
|-id=540 bgcolor=#E9E9E9
| 88540 ||  || — || August 22, 2001 || Socorro || LINEAR || — || align=right | 2.9 km || 
|-id=541 bgcolor=#E9E9E9
| 88541 ||  || — || August 22, 2001 || Socorro || LINEAR || — || align=right | 4.3 km || 
|-id=542 bgcolor=#E9E9E9
| 88542 ||  || — || August 22, 2001 || Socorro || LINEAR || — || align=right | 5.5 km || 
|-id=543 bgcolor=#E9E9E9
| 88543 ||  || — || August 22, 2001 || Palomar || NEAT || HNS || align=right | 2.7 km || 
|-id=544 bgcolor=#fefefe
| 88544 ||  || — || August 22, 2001 || Haleakala || NEAT || — || align=right | 2.0 km || 
|-id=545 bgcolor=#fefefe
| 88545 ||  || — || August 22, 2001 || Socorro || LINEAR || — || align=right | 5.6 km || 
|-id=546 bgcolor=#E9E9E9
| 88546 ||  || — || August 22, 2001 || Socorro || LINEAR || — || align=right | 3.2 km || 
|-id=547 bgcolor=#E9E9E9
| 88547 ||  || — || August 22, 2001 || Socorro || LINEAR || HNS || align=right | 3.5 km || 
|-id=548 bgcolor=#E9E9E9
| 88548 ||  || — || August 22, 2001 || Socorro || LINEAR || — || align=right | 2.0 km || 
|-id=549 bgcolor=#E9E9E9
| 88549 ||  || — || August 22, 2001 || Palomar || NEAT || HNS || align=right | 3.0 km || 
|-id=550 bgcolor=#E9E9E9
| 88550 ||  || — || August 22, 2001 || Socorro || LINEAR || — || align=right | 4.4 km || 
|-id=551 bgcolor=#fefefe
| 88551 ||  || — || August 22, 2001 || Socorro || LINEAR || ERI || align=right | 3.8 km || 
|-id=552 bgcolor=#fefefe
| 88552 ||  || — || August 22, 2001 || Socorro || LINEAR || V || align=right | 1.8 km || 
|-id=553 bgcolor=#E9E9E9
| 88553 ||  || — || August 22, 2001 || Socorro || LINEAR || MAR || align=right | 3.2 km || 
|-id=554 bgcolor=#d6d6d6
| 88554 ||  || — || August 22, 2001 || Socorro || LINEAR || ALA || align=right | 11 km || 
|-id=555 bgcolor=#d6d6d6
| 88555 ||  || — || August 22, 2001 || Socorro || LINEAR || — || align=right | 7.0 km || 
|-id=556 bgcolor=#fefefe
| 88556 ||  || — || August 23, 2001 || Anderson Mesa || LONEOS || MAS || align=right data-sort-value="0.93" | 930 m || 
|-id=557 bgcolor=#E9E9E9
| 88557 ||  || — || August 23, 2001 || Anderson Mesa || LONEOS || — || align=right | 2.4 km || 
|-id=558 bgcolor=#E9E9E9
| 88558 ||  || — || August 23, 2001 || Anderson Mesa || LONEOS || — || align=right | 3.0 km || 
|-id=559 bgcolor=#E9E9E9
| 88559 ||  || — || August 23, 2001 || Anderson Mesa || LONEOS || HEN || align=right | 2.2 km || 
|-id=560 bgcolor=#E9E9E9
| 88560 ||  || — || August 24, 2001 || Anderson Mesa || LONEOS || — || align=right | 2.0 km || 
|-id=561 bgcolor=#d6d6d6
| 88561 ||  || — || August 24, 2001 || Socorro || LINEAR || — || align=right | 5.7 km || 
|-id=562 bgcolor=#fefefe
| 88562 ||  || — || August 24, 2001 || Socorro || LINEAR || — || align=right | 1.4 km || 
|-id=563 bgcolor=#fefefe
| 88563 ||  || — || August 24, 2001 || Socorro || LINEAR || MAS || align=right | 1.3 km || 
|-id=564 bgcolor=#E9E9E9
| 88564 ||  || — || August 24, 2001 || Socorro || LINEAR || NEM || align=right | 2.7 km || 
|-id=565 bgcolor=#E9E9E9
| 88565 ||  || — || August 24, 2001 || Socorro || LINEAR || — || align=right | 4.0 km || 
|-id=566 bgcolor=#E9E9E9
| 88566 ||  || — || August 24, 2001 || Socorro || LINEAR || — || align=right | 3.3 km || 
|-id=567 bgcolor=#E9E9E9
| 88567 ||  || — || August 24, 2001 || Socorro || LINEAR || — || align=right | 2.3 km || 
|-id=568 bgcolor=#E9E9E9
| 88568 ||  || — || August 24, 2001 || Goodricke-Pigott || R. A. Tucker || — || align=right | 2.1 km || 
|-id=569 bgcolor=#fefefe
| 88569 ||  || — || August 24, 2001 || Socorro || LINEAR || — || align=right | 1.5 km || 
|-id=570 bgcolor=#fefefe
| 88570 ||  || — || August 24, 2001 || Socorro || LINEAR || — || align=right | 2.1 km || 
|-id=571 bgcolor=#fefefe
| 88571 ||  || — || August 24, 2001 || Socorro || LINEAR || — || align=right | 1.8 km || 
|-id=572 bgcolor=#fefefe
| 88572 ||  || — || August 24, 2001 || Socorro || LINEAR || — || align=right | 1.3 km || 
|-id=573 bgcolor=#d6d6d6
| 88573 ||  || — || August 24, 2001 || Anderson Mesa || LONEOS || — || align=right | 5.9 km || 
|-id=574 bgcolor=#fefefe
| 88574 ||  || — || August 24, 2001 || Socorro || LINEAR || — || align=right | 1.4 km || 
|-id=575 bgcolor=#fefefe
| 88575 ||  || — || August 24, 2001 || Socorro || LINEAR || — || align=right | 2.0 km || 
|-id=576 bgcolor=#E9E9E9
| 88576 ||  || — || August 24, 2001 || Socorro || LINEAR || — || align=right | 1.9 km || 
|-id=577 bgcolor=#E9E9E9
| 88577 ||  || — || August 24, 2001 || Haleakala || NEAT || — || align=right | 4.3 km || 
|-id=578 bgcolor=#E9E9E9
| 88578 ||  || — || August 25, 2001 || Socorro || LINEAR || — || align=right | 3.8 km || 
|-id=579 bgcolor=#E9E9E9
| 88579 ||  || — || August 25, 2001 || Socorro || LINEAR || — || align=right | 2.3 km || 
|-id=580 bgcolor=#fefefe
| 88580 ||  || — || August 25, 2001 || Socorro || LINEAR || V || align=right | 1.3 km || 
|-id=581 bgcolor=#E9E9E9
| 88581 ||  || — || August 25, 2001 || Socorro || LINEAR || RAF || align=right | 2.4 km || 
|-id=582 bgcolor=#fefefe
| 88582 ||  || — || August 25, 2001 || Socorro || LINEAR || — || align=right | 2.3 km || 
|-id=583 bgcolor=#fefefe
| 88583 ||  || — || August 25, 2001 || Socorro || LINEAR || V || align=right | 1.3 km || 
|-id=584 bgcolor=#fefefe
| 88584 ||  || — || August 25, 2001 || Socorro || LINEAR || — || align=right | 2.4 km || 
|-id=585 bgcolor=#E9E9E9
| 88585 ||  || — || August 25, 2001 || Palomar || NEAT || — || align=right | 4.0 km || 
|-id=586 bgcolor=#E9E9E9
| 88586 ||  || — || August 25, 2001 || Palomar || NEAT || MAR || align=right | 2.9 km || 
|-id=587 bgcolor=#fefefe
| 88587 ||  || — || August 25, 2001 || Anderson Mesa || LONEOS || — || align=right | 2.0 km || 
|-id=588 bgcolor=#E9E9E9
| 88588 ||  || — || August 25, 2001 || Desert Eagle || W. K. Y. Yeung || — || align=right | 3.9 km || 
|-id=589 bgcolor=#E9E9E9
| 88589 ||  || — || August 25, 2001 || Anderson Mesa || LONEOS || — || align=right | 4.1 km || 
|-id=590 bgcolor=#E9E9E9
| 88590 ||  || — || August 25, 2001 || Anderson Mesa || LONEOS || — || align=right | 4.4 km || 
|-id=591 bgcolor=#fefefe
| 88591 ||  || — || August 25, 2001 || Anderson Mesa || LONEOS || NYS || align=right | 1.5 km || 
|-id=592 bgcolor=#fefefe
| 88592 ||  || — || August 20, 2001 || Socorro || LINEAR || FLO || align=right | 1.3 km || 
|-id=593 bgcolor=#fefefe
| 88593 ||  || — || August 20, 2001 || Socorro || LINEAR || — || align=right | 1.3 km || 
|-id=594 bgcolor=#E9E9E9
| 88594 ||  || — || August 20, 2001 || Palomar || NEAT || INO || align=right | 2.8 km || 
|-id=595 bgcolor=#fefefe
| 88595 ||  || — || August 19, 2001 || Socorro || LINEAR || — || align=right | 1.9 km || 
|-id=596 bgcolor=#fefefe
| 88596 ||  || — || August 19, 2001 || Socorro || LINEAR || — || align=right | 3.6 km || 
|-id=597 bgcolor=#fefefe
| 88597 ||  || — || August 19, 2001 || Socorro || LINEAR || — || align=right | 1.8 km || 
|-id=598 bgcolor=#E9E9E9
| 88598 ||  || — || August 19, 2001 || Socorro || LINEAR || — || align=right | 1.8 km || 
|-id=599 bgcolor=#fefefe
| 88599 ||  || — || August 19, 2001 || Socorro || LINEAR || FLO || align=right | 2.4 km || 
|-id=600 bgcolor=#E9E9E9
| 88600 ||  || — || August 19, 2001 || Socorro || LINEAR || — || align=right | 3.9 km || 
|}

88601–88700 

|-bgcolor=#E9E9E9
| 88601 ||  || — || August 18, 2001 || Palomar || NEAT || — || align=right | 2.7 km || 
|-id=602 bgcolor=#E9E9E9
| 88602 ||  || — || August 16, 2001 || Socorro || LINEAR || — || align=right | 5.9 km || 
|-id=603 bgcolor=#E9E9E9
| 88603 ||  || — || August 16, 2001 || Socorro || LINEAR || GEF || align=right | 3.5 km || 
|-id=604 bgcolor=#E9E9E9
| 88604 ||  || — || August 31, 2001 || Palomar || NEAT || EUN || align=right | 5.8 km || 
|-id=605 bgcolor=#E9E9E9
| 88605 ||  || — || August 24, 2001 || Anderson Mesa || LONEOS || — || align=right | 2.0 km || 
|-id=606 bgcolor=#E9E9E9
| 88606 ||  || — || August 24, 2001 || Socorro || LINEAR || — || align=right | 2.0 km || 
|-id=607 bgcolor=#fefefe
| 88607 ||  || — || August 24, 2001 || Socorro || LINEAR || — || align=right | 1.6 km || 
|-id=608 bgcolor=#fefefe
| 88608 ||  || — || August 24, 2001 || Socorro || LINEAR || — || align=right | 1.5 km || 
|-id=609 bgcolor=#FA8072
| 88609 ||  || — || August 24, 2001 || Socorro || LINEAR || — || align=right | 1.8 km || 
|-id=610 bgcolor=#fefefe
| 88610 ||  || — || August 24, 2001 || Socorro || LINEAR || NYS || align=right | 1.6 km || 
|-id=611 bgcolor=#C2E0FF
| 88611 Teharonhiawako ||  ||  || August 20, 2001 || Cerro Tololo || DES || cubewano (cold)moon || align=right | 307 km || 
|-id=612 bgcolor=#E9E9E9
| 88612 ||  || — || August 25, 2001 || Palomar || NEAT || — || align=right | 3.9 km || 
|-id=613 bgcolor=#fefefe
| 88613 ||  || — || September 7, 2001 || Socorro || LINEAR || V || align=right | 1.2 km || 
|-id=614 bgcolor=#fefefe
| 88614 ||  || — || September 7, 2001 || Socorro || LINEAR || NYS || align=right | 1.3 km || 
|-id=615 bgcolor=#fefefe
| 88615 ||  || — || September 8, 2001 || Anderson Mesa || LONEOS || — || align=right | 1.8 km || 
|-id=616 bgcolor=#E9E9E9
| 88616 ||  || — || September 8, 2001 || Socorro || LINEAR || EUN || align=right | 3.4 km || 
|-id=617 bgcolor=#E9E9E9
| 88617 ||  || — || September 10, 2001 || Desert Eagle || W. K. Y. Yeung || — || align=right | 3.5 km || 
|-id=618 bgcolor=#E9E9E9
| 88618 ||  || — || September 10, 2001 || Desert Eagle || W. K. Y. Yeung || HEN || align=right | 2.8 km || 
|-id=619 bgcolor=#fefefe
| 88619 ||  || — || September 8, 2001 || Socorro || LINEAR || FLO || align=right | 1.4 km || 
|-id=620 bgcolor=#fefefe
| 88620 ||  || — || September 8, 2001 || Socorro || LINEAR || FLO || align=right | 1.3 km || 
|-id=621 bgcolor=#E9E9E9
| 88621 ||  || — || September 9, 2001 || Goodricke-Pigott || R. A. Tucker || — || align=right | 2.6 km || 
|-id=622 bgcolor=#fefefe
| 88622 ||  || — || September 10, 2001 || Goodricke-Pigott || R. A. Tucker || V || align=right | 1.6 km || 
|-id=623 bgcolor=#d6d6d6
| 88623 ||  || — || September 7, 2001 || Socorro || LINEAR || — || align=right | 6.7 km || 
|-id=624 bgcolor=#fefefe
| 88624 ||  || — || September 7, 2001 || Socorro || LINEAR || FLO || align=right | 1.0 km || 
|-id=625 bgcolor=#E9E9E9
| 88625 ||  || — || September 7, 2001 || Socorro || LINEAR || — || align=right | 3.6 km || 
|-id=626 bgcolor=#fefefe
| 88626 ||  || — || September 7, 2001 || Socorro || LINEAR || MAS || align=right | 1.7 km || 
|-id=627 bgcolor=#fefefe
| 88627 ||  || — || September 8, 2001 || Socorro || LINEAR || — || align=right | 1.6 km || 
|-id=628 bgcolor=#fefefe
| 88628 ||  || — || September 8, 2001 || Socorro || LINEAR || FLO || align=right | 2.7 km || 
|-id=629 bgcolor=#fefefe
| 88629 ||  || — || September 8, 2001 || Socorro || LINEAR || FLO || align=right | 2.3 km || 
|-id=630 bgcolor=#fefefe
| 88630 ||  || — || September 8, 2001 || Socorro || LINEAR || FLO || align=right | 1.2 km || 
|-id=631 bgcolor=#fefefe
| 88631 ||  || — || September 8, 2001 || Socorro || LINEAR || — || align=right | 1.4 km || 
|-id=632 bgcolor=#E9E9E9
| 88632 ||  || — || September 9, 2001 || Socorro || LINEAR || — || align=right | 1.8 km || 
|-id=633 bgcolor=#E9E9E9
| 88633 ||  || — || September 10, 2001 || Desert Eagle || W. K. Y. Yeung || — || align=right | 2.2 km || 
|-id=634 bgcolor=#fefefe
| 88634 ||  || — || September 12, 2001 || Palomar || NEAT || V || align=right | 1.5 km || 
|-id=635 bgcolor=#E9E9E9
| 88635 ||  || — || September 14, 2001 || Palomar || NEAT || — || align=right | 2.9 km || 
|-id=636 bgcolor=#E9E9E9
| 88636 ||  || — || September 14, 2001 || Palomar || NEAT || — || align=right | 2.1 km || 
|-id=637 bgcolor=#E9E9E9
| 88637 ||  || — || September 12, 2001 || Desert Eagle || W. K. Y. Yeung || — || align=right | 2.2 km || 
|-id=638 bgcolor=#E9E9E9
| 88638 ||  || — || September 13, 2001 || Prescott || P. G. Comba || — || align=right | 2.3 km || 
|-id=639 bgcolor=#fefefe
| 88639 ||  || — || September 11, 2001 || Socorro || LINEAR || PHO || align=right | 2.8 km || 
|-id=640 bgcolor=#E9E9E9
| 88640 ||  || — || September 10, 2001 || Socorro || LINEAR || — || align=right | 3.2 km || 
|-id=641 bgcolor=#E9E9E9
| 88641 ||  || — || September 12, 2001 || Socorro || LINEAR || — || align=right | 5.3 km || 
|-id=642 bgcolor=#E9E9E9
| 88642 ||  || — || September 12, 2001 || Socorro || LINEAR || — || align=right | 4.6 km || 
|-id=643 bgcolor=#E9E9E9
| 88643 ||  || — || September 12, 2001 || Socorro || LINEAR || — || align=right | 2.7 km || 
|-id=644 bgcolor=#fefefe
| 88644 ||  || — || September 10, 2001 || Socorro || LINEAR || — || align=right | 2.2 km || 
|-id=645 bgcolor=#fefefe
| 88645 ||  || — || September 10, 2001 || Socorro || LINEAR || — || align=right | 1.6 km || 
|-id=646 bgcolor=#E9E9E9
| 88646 ||  || — || September 10, 2001 || Socorro || LINEAR || — || align=right | 2.7 km || 
|-id=647 bgcolor=#E9E9E9
| 88647 ||  || — || September 10, 2001 || Socorro || LINEAR || — || align=right | 5.9 km || 
|-id=648 bgcolor=#E9E9E9
| 88648 ||  || — || September 10, 2001 || Socorro || LINEAR || — || align=right | 5.2 km || 
|-id=649 bgcolor=#E9E9E9
| 88649 ||  || — || September 10, 2001 || Socorro || LINEAR || — || align=right | 2.2 km || 
|-id=650 bgcolor=#E9E9E9
| 88650 ||  || — || September 10, 2001 || Socorro || LINEAR || — || align=right | 3.6 km || 
|-id=651 bgcolor=#fefefe
| 88651 ||  || — || September 10, 2001 || Socorro || LINEAR || — || align=right | 2.5 km || 
|-id=652 bgcolor=#E9E9E9
| 88652 ||  || — || September 10, 2001 || Socorro || LINEAR || EUN || align=right | 2.6 km || 
|-id=653 bgcolor=#E9E9E9
| 88653 ||  || — || September 10, 2001 || Socorro || LINEAR || PAD || align=right | 6.2 km || 
|-id=654 bgcolor=#fefefe
| 88654 ||  || — || September 10, 2001 || Socorro || LINEAR || — || align=right | 1.9 km || 
|-id=655 bgcolor=#d6d6d6
| 88655 ||  || — || September 10, 2001 || Socorro || LINEAR || — || align=right | 6.7 km || 
|-id=656 bgcolor=#fefefe
| 88656 ||  || — || September 10, 2001 || Socorro || LINEAR || ERI || align=right | 4.1 km || 
|-id=657 bgcolor=#fefefe
| 88657 ||  || — || September 10, 2001 || Socorro || LINEAR || — || align=right | 1.8 km || 
|-id=658 bgcolor=#E9E9E9
| 88658 ||  || — || September 10, 2001 || Socorro || LINEAR || — || align=right | 2.2 km || 
|-id=659 bgcolor=#fefefe
| 88659 ||  || — || September 10, 2001 || Socorro || LINEAR || — || align=right | 1.5 km || 
|-id=660 bgcolor=#fefefe
| 88660 ||  || — || September 10, 2001 || Socorro || LINEAR || — || align=right | 1.7 km || 
|-id=661 bgcolor=#fefefe
| 88661 ||  || — || September 10, 2001 || Socorro || LINEAR || V || align=right | 1.6 km || 
|-id=662 bgcolor=#E9E9E9
| 88662 ||  || — || September 10, 2001 || Socorro || LINEAR || — || align=right | 3.5 km || 
|-id=663 bgcolor=#fefefe
| 88663 ||  || — || September 10, 2001 || Socorro || LINEAR || NYS || align=right | 1.7 km || 
|-id=664 bgcolor=#fefefe
| 88664 ||  || — || September 10, 2001 || Socorro || LINEAR || NYS || align=right | 2.2 km || 
|-id=665 bgcolor=#fefefe
| 88665 ||  || — || September 10, 2001 || Socorro || LINEAR || — || align=right | 1.9 km || 
|-id=666 bgcolor=#fefefe
| 88666 ||  || — || September 10, 2001 || Socorro || LINEAR || — || align=right | 1.7 km || 
|-id=667 bgcolor=#fefefe
| 88667 ||  || — || September 10, 2001 || Socorro || LINEAR || — || align=right | 2.2 km || 
|-id=668 bgcolor=#fefefe
| 88668 ||  || — || September 14, 2001 || Palomar || NEAT || — || align=right | 3.1 km || 
|-id=669 bgcolor=#E9E9E9
| 88669 ||  || — || September 11, 2001 || Anderson Mesa || LONEOS || WIT || align=right | 1.9 km || 
|-id=670 bgcolor=#E9E9E9
| 88670 ||  || — || September 11, 2001 || Anderson Mesa || LONEOS || — || align=right | 2.2 km || 
|-id=671 bgcolor=#fefefe
| 88671 ||  || — || September 11, 2001 || Anderson Mesa || LONEOS || — || align=right | 3.1 km || 
|-id=672 bgcolor=#fefefe
| 88672 ||  || — || September 11, 2001 || Anderson Mesa || LONEOS || — || align=right | 1.1 km || 
|-id=673 bgcolor=#E9E9E9
| 88673 ||  || — || September 11, 2001 || Anderson Mesa || LONEOS || — || align=right | 4.1 km || 
|-id=674 bgcolor=#fefefe
| 88674 ||  || — || September 11, 2001 || Anderson Mesa || LONEOS || — || align=right | 1.4 km || 
|-id=675 bgcolor=#E9E9E9
| 88675 ||  || — || September 11, 2001 || Anderson Mesa || LONEOS || — || align=right | 3.0 km || 
|-id=676 bgcolor=#E9E9E9
| 88676 ||  || — || September 11, 2001 || Anderson Mesa || LONEOS || — || align=right | 4.0 km || 
|-id=677 bgcolor=#E9E9E9
| 88677 ||  || — || September 11, 2001 || Anderson Mesa || LONEOS || — || align=right | 3.7 km || 
|-id=678 bgcolor=#E9E9E9
| 88678 ||  || — || September 11, 2001 || Anderson Mesa || LONEOS || GEF || align=right | 2.3 km || 
|-id=679 bgcolor=#E9E9E9
| 88679 ||  || — || September 11, 2001 || Anderson Mesa || LONEOS || — || align=right | 1.7 km || 
|-id=680 bgcolor=#d6d6d6
| 88680 ||  || — || September 11, 2001 || Anderson Mesa || LONEOS || — || align=right | 5.5 km || 
|-id=681 bgcolor=#E9E9E9
| 88681 ||  || — || September 11, 2001 || Anderson Mesa || LONEOS || NEM || align=right | 2.5 km || 
|-id=682 bgcolor=#fefefe
| 88682 ||  || — || September 12, 2001 || Kitt Peak || Spacewatch || — || align=right | 2.5 km || 
|-id=683 bgcolor=#fefefe
| 88683 ||  || — || September 12, 2001 || Socorro || LINEAR || — || align=right | 1.7 km || 
|-id=684 bgcolor=#fefefe
| 88684 ||  || — || September 12, 2001 || Socorro || LINEAR || FLO || align=right | 1.5 km || 
|-id=685 bgcolor=#E9E9E9
| 88685 ||  || — || September 12, 2001 || Socorro || LINEAR || — || align=right | 4.6 km || 
|-id=686 bgcolor=#fefefe
| 88686 ||  || — || September 12, 2001 || Socorro || LINEAR || — || align=right | 1.9 km || 
|-id=687 bgcolor=#fefefe
| 88687 ||  || — || September 12, 2001 || Socorro || LINEAR || MAS || align=right | 1.7 km || 
|-id=688 bgcolor=#E9E9E9
| 88688 ||  || — || September 12, 2001 || Socorro || LINEAR || — || align=right | 4.8 km || 
|-id=689 bgcolor=#fefefe
| 88689 ||  || — || September 12, 2001 || Socorro || LINEAR || — || align=right | 1.8 km || 
|-id=690 bgcolor=#E9E9E9
| 88690 ||  || — || September 12, 2001 || Socorro || LINEAR || — || align=right | 2.0 km || 
|-id=691 bgcolor=#fefefe
| 88691 ||  || — || September 12, 2001 || Socorro || LINEAR || — || align=right | 1.4 km || 
|-id=692 bgcolor=#E9E9E9
| 88692 ||  || — || September 12, 2001 || Socorro || LINEAR || — || align=right | 2.1 km || 
|-id=693 bgcolor=#fefefe
| 88693 ||  || — || September 12, 2001 || Socorro || LINEAR || NYS || align=right | 1.3 km || 
|-id=694 bgcolor=#E9E9E9
| 88694 ||  || — || September 12, 2001 || Socorro || LINEAR || — || align=right | 1.9 km || 
|-id=695 bgcolor=#d6d6d6
| 88695 ||  || — || September 12, 2001 || Socorro || LINEAR || — || align=right | 5.1 km || 
|-id=696 bgcolor=#d6d6d6
| 88696 ||  || — || September 12, 2001 || Socorro || LINEAR || — || align=right | 3.9 km || 
|-id=697 bgcolor=#fefefe
| 88697 ||  || — || September 12, 2001 || Socorro || LINEAR || — || align=right | 1.5 km || 
|-id=698 bgcolor=#fefefe
| 88698 ||  || — || September 11, 2001 || Palomar || NEAT || FLO || align=right | 1.5 km || 
|-id=699 bgcolor=#fefefe
| 88699 ||  || — || September 14, 2001 || Palomar || NEAT || FLO || align=right | 2.6 km || 
|-id=700 bgcolor=#E9E9E9
| 88700 ||  || — || September 15, 2001 || Palomar || NEAT || GEF || align=right | 5.9 km || 
|}

88701–88800 

|-bgcolor=#fefefe
| 88701 ||  || — || September 11, 2001 || Anderson Mesa || LONEOS || — || align=right | 1.9 km || 
|-id=702 bgcolor=#fefefe
| 88702 ||  || — || September 11, 2001 || Anderson Mesa || LONEOS || — || align=right | 1.6 km || 
|-id=703 bgcolor=#E9E9E9
| 88703 ||  || — || September 12, 2001 || Socorro || LINEAR || — || align=right | 5.6 km || 
|-id=704 bgcolor=#fefefe
| 88704 || 2001 SF || — || September 16, 2001 || Fountain Hills || C. W. Juels, P. R. Holvorcem || NYS || align=right | 1.5 km || 
|-id=705 bgcolor=#d6d6d6
| 88705 Potato || 2001 SV ||  || September 17, 2001 || Desert Eagle || W. K. Y. Yeung || — || align=right | 4.8 km || 
|-id=706 bgcolor=#d6d6d6
| 88706 || 2001 SW || — || September 17, 2001 || Desert Eagle || W. K. Y. Yeung || — || align=right | 4.7 km || 
|-id=707 bgcolor=#fefefe
| 88707 ||  || — || September 17, 2001 || Desert Eagle || W. K. Y. Yeung || V || align=right | 1.2 km || 
|-id=708 bgcolor=#fefefe
| 88708 ||  || — || September 17, 2001 || Desert Eagle || W. K. Y. Yeung || — || align=right | 1.2 km || 
|-id=709 bgcolor=#E9E9E9
| 88709 ||  || — || September 17, 2001 || Desert Eagle || W. K. Y. Yeung || — || align=right | 3.4 km || 
|-id=710 bgcolor=#FFC2E0
| 88710 ||  || — || September 18, 2001 || Palomar || NEAT || APO +1kmmooncritical || align=right data-sort-value="0.76" | 760 m || 
|-id=711 bgcolor=#d6d6d6
| 88711 ||  || — || September 18, 2001 || Desert Eagle || W. K. Y. Yeung || KOR || align=right | 3.3 km || 
|-id=712 bgcolor=#E9E9E9
| 88712 ||  || — || September 16, 2001 || Socorro || LINEAR || ADE || align=right | 4.4 km || 
|-id=713 bgcolor=#fefefe
| 88713 ||  || — || September 16, 2001 || Socorro || LINEAR || NYS || align=right | 1.7 km || 
|-id=714 bgcolor=#E9E9E9
| 88714 ||  || — || September 16, 2001 || Socorro || LINEAR || GEF || align=right | 3.9 km || 
|-id=715 bgcolor=#fefefe
| 88715 ||  || — || September 16, 2001 || Socorro || LINEAR || — || align=right | 2.1 km || 
|-id=716 bgcolor=#E9E9E9
| 88716 ||  || — || September 16, 2001 || Socorro || LINEAR || — || align=right | 1.8 km || 
|-id=717 bgcolor=#fefefe
| 88717 ||  || — || September 16, 2001 || Socorro || LINEAR || FLO || align=right | 1.3 km || 
|-id=718 bgcolor=#E9E9E9
| 88718 ||  || — || September 16, 2001 || Socorro || LINEAR || — || align=right | 3.3 km || 
|-id=719 bgcolor=#E9E9E9
| 88719 ||  || — || September 16, 2001 || Socorro || LINEAR || — || align=right | 4.9 km || 
|-id=720 bgcolor=#E9E9E9
| 88720 ||  || — || September 16, 2001 || Socorro || LINEAR || — || align=right | 3.2 km || 
|-id=721 bgcolor=#d6d6d6
| 88721 ||  || — || September 16, 2001 || Socorro || LINEAR || — || align=right | 6.6 km || 
|-id=722 bgcolor=#fefefe
| 88722 ||  || — || September 16, 2001 || Socorro || LINEAR || — || align=right | 1.7 km || 
|-id=723 bgcolor=#d6d6d6
| 88723 ||  || — || September 16, 2001 || Socorro || LINEAR || 628 || align=right | 4.7 km || 
|-id=724 bgcolor=#fefefe
| 88724 ||  || — || September 16, 2001 || Socorro || LINEAR || — || align=right | 1.6 km || 
|-id=725 bgcolor=#E9E9E9
| 88725 ||  || — || September 16, 2001 || Socorro || LINEAR || — || align=right | 5.1 km || 
|-id=726 bgcolor=#E9E9E9
| 88726 ||  || — || September 16, 2001 || Socorro || LINEAR || — || align=right | 1.6 km || 
|-id=727 bgcolor=#E9E9E9
| 88727 ||  || — || September 16, 2001 || Socorro || LINEAR || — || align=right | 5.6 km || 
|-id=728 bgcolor=#fefefe
| 88728 ||  || — || September 16, 2001 || Socorro || LINEAR || NYS || align=right | 1.2 km || 
|-id=729 bgcolor=#E9E9E9
| 88729 ||  || — || September 16, 2001 || Socorro || LINEAR || — || align=right | 2.3 km || 
|-id=730 bgcolor=#E9E9E9
| 88730 ||  || — || September 16, 2001 || Socorro || LINEAR || — || align=right | 2.6 km || 
|-id=731 bgcolor=#d6d6d6
| 88731 ||  || — || September 16, 2001 || Socorro || LINEAR || — || align=right | 9.4 km || 
|-id=732 bgcolor=#fefefe
| 88732 ||  || — || September 16, 2001 || Socorro || LINEAR || — || align=right | 1.8 km || 
|-id=733 bgcolor=#fefefe
| 88733 ||  || — || September 16, 2001 || Socorro || LINEAR || — || align=right | 3.5 km || 
|-id=734 bgcolor=#E9E9E9
| 88734 ||  || — || September 16, 2001 || Socorro || LINEAR || — || align=right | 3.2 km || 
|-id=735 bgcolor=#fefefe
| 88735 ||  || — || September 16, 2001 || Socorro || LINEAR || NYS || align=right | 1.1 km || 
|-id=736 bgcolor=#E9E9E9
| 88736 ||  || — || September 16, 2001 || Socorro || LINEAR || EUN || align=right | 3.0 km || 
|-id=737 bgcolor=#fefefe
| 88737 ||  || — || September 16, 2001 || Socorro || LINEAR || — || align=right | 1.5 km || 
|-id=738 bgcolor=#fefefe
| 88738 ||  || — || September 16, 2001 || Socorro || LINEAR || NYS || align=right | 1.6 km || 
|-id=739 bgcolor=#fefefe
| 88739 ||  || — || September 16, 2001 || Socorro || LINEAR || — || align=right | 1.7 km || 
|-id=740 bgcolor=#fefefe
| 88740 ||  || — || September 16, 2001 || Socorro || LINEAR || MAS || align=right | 1.6 km || 
|-id=741 bgcolor=#fefefe
| 88741 ||  || — || September 16, 2001 || Socorro || LINEAR || — || align=right | 2.0 km || 
|-id=742 bgcolor=#fefefe
| 88742 ||  || — || September 16, 2001 || Socorro || LINEAR || — || align=right | 1.9 km || 
|-id=743 bgcolor=#fefefe
| 88743 ||  || — || September 16, 2001 || Socorro || LINEAR || NYS || align=right | 4.6 km || 
|-id=744 bgcolor=#E9E9E9
| 88744 ||  || — || September 16, 2001 || Socorro || LINEAR || — || align=right | 2.2 km || 
|-id=745 bgcolor=#fefefe
| 88745 ||  || — || September 16, 2001 || Socorro || LINEAR || — || align=right | 2.0 km || 
|-id=746 bgcolor=#E9E9E9
| 88746 ||  || — || September 16, 2001 || Socorro || LINEAR || AER || align=right | 2.6 km || 
|-id=747 bgcolor=#E9E9E9
| 88747 ||  || — || September 16, 2001 || Socorro || LINEAR || HEN || align=right | 2.3 km || 
|-id=748 bgcolor=#fefefe
| 88748 ||  || — || September 16, 2001 || Socorro || LINEAR || FLO || align=right | 1.1 km || 
|-id=749 bgcolor=#fefefe
| 88749 ||  || — || September 16, 2001 || Socorro || LINEAR || — || align=right | 1.8 km || 
|-id=750 bgcolor=#E9E9E9
| 88750 ||  || — || September 16, 2001 || Socorro || LINEAR || — || align=right | 2.5 km || 
|-id=751 bgcolor=#E9E9E9
| 88751 ||  || — || September 16, 2001 || Socorro || LINEAR || EUN || align=right | 2.9 km || 
|-id=752 bgcolor=#fefefe
| 88752 ||  || — || September 16, 2001 || Socorro || LINEAR || — || align=right | 1.6 km || 
|-id=753 bgcolor=#E9E9E9
| 88753 ||  || — || September 17, 2001 || Socorro || LINEAR || — || align=right | 2.0 km || 
|-id=754 bgcolor=#E9E9E9
| 88754 ||  || — || September 17, 2001 || Socorro || LINEAR || — || align=right | 5.2 km || 
|-id=755 bgcolor=#fefefe
| 88755 ||  || — || September 17, 2001 || Socorro || LINEAR || MAS || align=right | 1.2 km || 
|-id=756 bgcolor=#d6d6d6
| 88756 ||  || — || September 17, 2001 || Socorro || LINEAR || KOR || align=right | 3.8 km || 
|-id=757 bgcolor=#fefefe
| 88757 ||  || — || September 17, 2001 || Socorro || LINEAR || — || align=right | 2.6 km || 
|-id=758 bgcolor=#E9E9E9
| 88758 ||  || — || September 17, 2001 || Socorro || LINEAR || — || align=right | 2.7 km || 
|-id=759 bgcolor=#d6d6d6
| 88759 ||  || — || September 17, 2001 || Socorro || LINEAR || TIR || align=right | 4.2 km || 
|-id=760 bgcolor=#fefefe
| 88760 ||  || — || September 17, 2001 || Socorro || LINEAR || V || align=right | 1.4 km || 
|-id=761 bgcolor=#E9E9E9
| 88761 ||  || — || September 17, 2001 || Socorro || LINEAR || — || align=right | 2.3 km || 
|-id=762 bgcolor=#fefefe
| 88762 ||  || — || September 17, 2001 || Socorro || LINEAR || — || align=right | 1.5 km || 
|-id=763 bgcolor=#E9E9E9
| 88763 ||  || — || September 17, 2001 || Socorro || LINEAR || — || align=right | 3.6 km || 
|-id=764 bgcolor=#E9E9E9
| 88764 ||  || — || September 17, 2001 || Socorro || LINEAR || — || align=right | 4.6 km || 
|-id=765 bgcolor=#fefefe
| 88765 ||  || — || September 17, 2001 || Socorro || LINEAR || V || align=right | 1.4 km || 
|-id=766 bgcolor=#fefefe
| 88766 ||  || — || September 17, 2001 || Socorro || LINEAR || V || align=right | 1.4 km || 
|-id=767 bgcolor=#E9E9E9
| 88767 ||  || — || September 17, 2001 || Socorro || LINEAR || — || align=right | 2.1 km || 
|-id=768 bgcolor=#E9E9E9
| 88768 ||  || — || September 17, 2001 || Socorro || LINEAR || AER || align=right | 3.1 km || 
|-id=769 bgcolor=#fefefe
| 88769 ||  || — || September 17, 2001 || Socorro || LINEAR || ERI || align=right | 5.1 km || 
|-id=770 bgcolor=#fefefe
| 88770 ||  || — || September 17, 2001 || Socorro || LINEAR || FLO || align=right | 1.7 km || 
|-id=771 bgcolor=#fefefe
| 88771 ||  || — || September 17, 2001 || Socorro || LINEAR || — || align=right | 1.5 km || 
|-id=772 bgcolor=#E9E9E9
| 88772 ||  || — || September 19, 2001 || Anderson Mesa || LONEOS || MAR || align=right | 2.6 km || 
|-id=773 bgcolor=#E9E9E9
| 88773 ||  || — || September 19, 2001 || Anderson Mesa || LONEOS || — || align=right | 4.7 km || 
|-id=774 bgcolor=#E9E9E9
| 88774 ||  || — || September 19, 2001 || Anderson Mesa || LONEOS || — || align=right | 2.6 km || 
|-id=775 bgcolor=#C2FFFF
| 88775 ||  || — || September 16, 2001 || Socorro || LINEAR || L5 || align=right | 14 km || 
|-id=776 bgcolor=#E9E9E9
| 88776 ||  || — || September 17, 2001 || Socorro || LINEAR || WIT || align=right | 2.1 km || 
|-id=777 bgcolor=#E9E9E9
| 88777 ||  || — || September 20, 2001 || Socorro || LINEAR || — || align=right | 2.2 km || 
|-id=778 bgcolor=#E9E9E9
| 88778 ||  || — || September 20, 2001 || Socorro || LINEAR || — || align=right | 3.7 km || 
|-id=779 bgcolor=#d6d6d6
| 88779 ||  || — || September 20, 2001 || Socorro || LINEAR || — || align=right | 4.2 km || 
|-id=780 bgcolor=#fefefe
| 88780 ||  || — || September 20, 2001 || Socorro || LINEAR || — || align=right | 1.5 km || 
|-id=781 bgcolor=#fefefe
| 88781 ||  || — || September 20, 2001 || Socorro || LINEAR || V || align=right | 1.5 km || 
|-id=782 bgcolor=#fefefe
| 88782 ||  || — || September 20, 2001 || Socorro || LINEAR || FLO || align=right | 1.6 km || 
|-id=783 bgcolor=#fefefe
| 88783 ||  || — || September 20, 2001 || Socorro || LINEAR || — || align=right | 2.1 km || 
|-id=784 bgcolor=#fefefe
| 88784 ||  || — || September 20, 2001 || Socorro || LINEAR || — || align=right | 3.1 km || 
|-id=785 bgcolor=#fefefe
| 88785 ||  || — || September 20, 2001 || Socorro || LINEAR || — || align=right | 1.5 km || 
|-id=786 bgcolor=#fefefe
| 88786 ||  || — || September 20, 2001 || Socorro || LINEAR || — || align=right | 2.0 km || 
|-id=787 bgcolor=#E9E9E9
| 88787 ||  || — || September 20, 2001 || Socorro || LINEAR || — || align=right | 5.2 km || 
|-id=788 bgcolor=#fefefe
| 88788 ||  || — || September 20, 2001 || Socorro || LINEAR || — || align=right | 2.3 km || 
|-id=789 bgcolor=#fefefe
| 88789 ||  || — || September 20, 2001 || Socorro || LINEAR || FLO || align=right | 1.2 km || 
|-id=790 bgcolor=#fefefe
| 88790 ||  || — || September 20, 2001 || Socorro || LINEAR || — || align=right | 2.8 km || 
|-id=791 bgcolor=#fefefe
| 88791 ||  || — || September 20, 2001 || Socorro || LINEAR || FLO || align=right | 1.5 km || 
|-id=792 bgcolor=#fefefe
| 88792 ||  || — || September 18, 2001 || Desert Eagle || W. K. Y. Yeung || — || align=right | 1.9 km || 
|-id=793 bgcolor=#E9E9E9
| 88793 ||  || — || September 20, 2001 || Desert Eagle || W. K. Y. Yeung || — || align=right | 4.5 km || 
|-id=794 bgcolor=#E9E9E9
| 88794 ||  || — || September 20, 2001 || Desert Eagle || W. K. Y. Yeung || — || align=right | 2.2 km || 
|-id=795 bgcolor=#E9E9E9
| 88795 Morvan ||  ||  || September 20, 2001 || Le Creusot || J.-C. Merlin || — || align=right | 3.5 km || 
|-id=796 bgcolor=#E9E9E9
| 88796 ||  || — || September 22, 2001 || Fountain Hills || C. W. Juels, P. R. Holvorcem || — || align=right | 3.6 km || 
|-id=797 bgcolor=#fefefe
| 88797 ||  || — || September 16, 2001 || Socorro || LINEAR || FLO || align=right | 1.2 km || 
|-id=798 bgcolor=#fefefe
| 88798 ||  || — || September 16, 2001 || Socorro || LINEAR || — || align=right | 1.6 km || 
|-id=799 bgcolor=#d6d6d6
| 88799 ||  || — || September 16, 2001 || Socorro || LINEAR || — || align=right | 4.9 km || 
|-id=800 bgcolor=#fefefe
| 88800 ||  || — || September 16, 2001 || Socorro || LINEAR || FLO || align=right | 1.2 km || 
|}

88801–88900 

|-bgcolor=#E9E9E9
| 88801 ||  || — || September 16, 2001 || Socorro || LINEAR || — || align=right | 2.3 km || 
|-id=802 bgcolor=#d6d6d6
| 88802 ||  || — || September 16, 2001 || Socorro || LINEAR || HYG || align=right | 5.6 km || 
|-id=803 bgcolor=#E9E9E9
| 88803 ||  || — || September 16, 2001 || Socorro || LINEAR || MAR || align=right | 2.1 km || 
|-id=804 bgcolor=#E9E9E9
| 88804 ||  || — || September 16, 2001 || Socorro || LINEAR || — || align=right | 2.5 km || 
|-id=805 bgcolor=#fefefe
| 88805 ||  || — || September 16, 2001 || Socorro || LINEAR || — || align=right | 1.6 km || 
|-id=806 bgcolor=#E9E9E9
| 88806 ||  || — || September 16, 2001 || Socorro || LINEAR || — || align=right | 2.7 km || 
|-id=807 bgcolor=#d6d6d6
| 88807 ||  || — || September 16, 2001 || Socorro || LINEAR || KOR || align=right | 2.6 km || 
|-id=808 bgcolor=#fefefe
| 88808 ||  || — || September 16, 2001 || Socorro || LINEAR || — || align=right | 1.2 km || 
|-id=809 bgcolor=#E9E9E9
| 88809 ||  || — || September 16, 2001 || Socorro || LINEAR || — || align=right | 1.7 km || 
|-id=810 bgcolor=#E9E9E9
| 88810 ||  || — || September 16, 2001 || Socorro || LINEAR || — || align=right | 3.0 km || 
|-id=811 bgcolor=#fefefe
| 88811 ||  || — || September 16, 2001 || Socorro || LINEAR || — || align=right | 1.5 km || 
|-id=812 bgcolor=#fefefe
| 88812 ||  || — || September 16, 2001 || Socorro || LINEAR || — || align=right | 1.4 km || 
|-id=813 bgcolor=#fefefe
| 88813 ||  || — || September 16, 2001 || Socorro || LINEAR || — || align=right | 3.7 km || 
|-id=814 bgcolor=#fefefe
| 88814 ||  || — || September 17, 2001 || Socorro || LINEAR || — || align=right | 1.9 km || 
|-id=815 bgcolor=#E9E9E9
| 88815 ||  || — || September 17, 2001 || Socorro || LINEAR || — || align=right | 3.1 km || 
|-id=816 bgcolor=#fefefe
| 88816 ||  || — || September 17, 2001 || Socorro || LINEAR || FLO || align=right | 1.1 km || 
|-id=817 bgcolor=#fefefe
| 88817 ||  || — || September 17, 2001 || Socorro || LINEAR || — || align=right | 1.6 km || 
|-id=818 bgcolor=#E9E9E9
| 88818 ||  || — || September 17, 2001 || Socorro || LINEAR || — || align=right | 4.5 km || 
|-id=819 bgcolor=#E9E9E9
| 88819 ||  || — || September 17, 2001 || Socorro || LINEAR || — || align=right | 3.7 km || 
|-id=820 bgcolor=#E9E9E9
| 88820 ||  || — || September 17, 2001 || Socorro || LINEAR || — || align=right | 4.9 km || 
|-id=821 bgcolor=#fefefe
| 88821 ||  || — || September 17, 2001 || Socorro || LINEAR || — || align=right | 1.4 km || 
|-id=822 bgcolor=#fefefe
| 88822 ||  || — || September 17, 2001 || Socorro || LINEAR || — || align=right | 1.4 km || 
|-id=823 bgcolor=#fefefe
| 88823 ||  || — || September 17, 2001 || Socorro || LINEAR || — || align=right | 1.6 km || 
|-id=824 bgcolor=#E9E9E9
| 88824 ||  || — || September 17, 2001 || Socorro || LINEAR || — || align=right | 3.3 km || 
|-id=825 bgcolor=#E9E9E9
| 88825 ||  || — || September 17, 2001 || Socorro || LINEAR || — || align=right | 1.9 km || 
|-id=826 bgcolor=#fefefe
| 88826 ||  || — || September 17, 2001 || Socorro || LINEAR || — || align=right | 1.5 km || 
|-id=827 bgcolor=#fefefe
| 88827 ||  || — || September 17, 2001 || Socorro || LINEAR || NYS || align=right | 1.9 km || 
|-id=828 bgcolor=#E9E9E9
| 88828 ||  || — || September 17, 2001 || Socorro || LINEAR || — || align=right | 3.9 km || 
|-id=829 bgcolor=#E9E9E9
| 88829 ||  || — || September 17, 2001 || Socorro || LINEAR || — || align=right | 4.5 km || 
|-id=830 bgcolor=#fefefe
| 88830 ||  || — || September 17, 2001 || Socorro || LINEAR || MAS || align=right | 1.3 km || 
|-id=831 bgcolor=#E9E9E9
| 88831 ||  || — || September 17, 2001 || Socorro || LINEAR || — || align=right | 3.7 km || 
|-id=832 bgcolor=#E9E9E9
| 88832 ||  || — || September 19, 2001 || Socorro || LINEAR || — || align=right | 1.7 km || 
|-id=833 bgcolor=#fefefe
| 88833 ||  || — || September 19, 2001 || Socorro || LINEAR || MAS || align=right | 2.1 km || 
|-id=834 bgcolor=#E9E9E9
| 88834 ||  || — || September 19, 2001 || Socorro || LINEAR || — || align=right | 3.7 km || 
|-id=835 bgcolor=#E9E9E9
| 88835 ||  || — || September 16, 2001 || Socorro || LINEAR || — || align=right | 3.0 km || 
|-id=836 bgcolor=#E9E9E9
| 88836 ||  || — || September 16, 2001 || Socorro || LINEAR || — || align=right | 3.1 km || 
|-id=837 bgcolor=#fefefe
| 88837 ||  || — || September 16, 2001 || Socorro || LINEAR || NYS || align=right | 3.4 km || 
|-id=838 bgcolor=#E9E9E9
| 88838 ||  || — || September 16, 2001 || Socorro || LINEAR || — || align=right | 4.2 km || 
|-id=839 bgcolor=#E9E9E9
| 88839 ||  || — || September 16, 2001 || Socorro || LINEAR || — || align=right | 2.4 km || 
|-id=840 bgcolor=#fefefe
| 88840 ||  || — || September 16, 2001 || Socorro || LINEAR || — || align=right | 2.6 km || 
|-id=841 bgcolor=#fefefe
| 88841 ||  || — || September 17, 2001 || Socorro || LINEAR || — || align=right | 1.6 km || 
|-id=842 bgcolor=#E9E9E9
| 88842 ||  || — || September 17, 2001 || Socorro || LINEAR || HEN || align=right | 3.8 km || 
|-id=843 bgcolor=#fefefe
| 88843 ||  || — || September 17, 2001 || Socorro || LINEAR || FLO || align=right | 1.0 km || 
|-id=844 bgcolor=#E9E9E9
| 88844 ||  || — || September 17, 2001 || Socorro || LINEAR || — || align=right | 3.4 km || 
|-id=845 bgcolor=#d6d6d6
| 88845 ||  || — || September 17, 2001 || Socorro || LINEAR || — || align=right | 6.5 km || 
|-id=846 bgcolor=#E9E9E9
| 88846 ||  || — || September 19, 2001 || Socorro || LINEAR || — || align=right | 2.8 km || 
|-id=847 bgcolor=#E9E9E9
| 88847 ||  || — || September 19, 2001 || Socorro || LINEAR || MIS || align=right | 3.4 km || 
|-id=848 bgcolor=#fefefe
| 88848 ||  || — || September 19, 2001 || Socorro || LINEAR || — || align=right | 1.6 km || 
|-id=849 bgcolor=#fefefe
| 88849 ||  || — || September 19, 2001 || Socorro || LINEAR || V || align=right | 1.1 km || 
|-id=850 bgcolor=#E9E9E9
| 88850 ||  || — || September 19, 2001 || Socorro || LINEAR || — || align=right | 3.4 km || 
|-id=851 bgcolor=#d6d6d6
| 88851 ||  || — || September 19, 2001 || Socorro || LINEAR || — || align=right | 4.3 km || 
|-id=852 bgcolor=#E9E9E9
| 88852 ||  || — || September 19, 2001 || Socorro || LINEAR || — || align=right | 2.8 km || 
|-id=853 bgcolor=#fefefe
| 88853 ||  || — || September 19, 2001 || Socorro || LINEAR || — || align=right | 1.4 km || 
|-id=854 bgcolor=#fefefe
| 88854 ||  || — || September 19, 2001 || Socorro || LINEAR || — || align=right | 4.7 km || 
|-id=855 bgcolor=#E9E9E9
| 88855 ||  || — || September 19, 2001 || Socorro || LINEAR || — || align=right | 5.1 km || 
|-id=856 bgcolor=#fefefe
| 88856 ||  || — || September 19, 2001 || Socorro || LINEAR || — || align=right | 2.1 km || 
|-id=857 bgcolor=#fefefe
| 88857 ||  || — || September 19, 2001 || Socorro || LINEAR || — || align=right | 1.6 km || 
|-id=858 bgcolor=#E9E9E9
| 88858 ||  || — || September 19, 2001 || Socorro || LINEAR || — || align=right | 3.7 km || 
|-id=859 bgcolor=#E9E9E9
| 88859 ||  || — || September 19, 2001 || Socorro || LINEAR || — || align=right | 3.1 km || 
|-id=860 bgcolor=#d6d6d6
| 88860 ||  || — || September 19, 2001 || Socorro || LINEAR || — || align=right | 5.0 km || 
|-id=861 bgcolor=#E9E9E9
| 88861 ||  || — || September 19, 2001 || Socorro || LINEAR || — || align=right | 3.3 km || 
|-id=862 bgcolor=#d6d6d6
| 88862 ||  || — || September 19, 2001 || Socorro || LINEAR || KOR || align=right | 3.1 km || 
|-id=863 bgcolor=#E9E9E9
| 88863 ||  || — || September 19, 2001 || Socorro || LINEAR || — || align=right | 1.7 km || 
|-id=864 bgcolor=#d6d6d6
| 88864 ||  || — || September 19, 2001 || Socorro || LINEAR || — || align=right | 4.7 km || 
|-id=865 bgcolor=#d6d6d6
| 88865 ||  || — || September 19, 2001 || Socorro || LINEAR || — || align=right | 6.8 km || 
|-id=866 bgcolor=#E9E9E9
| 88866 ||  || — || September 19, 2001 || Socorro || LINEAR || — || align=right | 4.1 km || 
|-id=867 bgcolor=#E9E9E9
| 88867 ||  || — || September 19, 2001 || Socorro || LINEAR || AST || align=right | 3.1 km || 
|-id=868 bgcolor=#fefefe
| 88868 ||  || — || September 19, 2001 || Socorro || LINEAR || NYS || align=right | 2.1 km || 
|-id=869 bgcolor=#fefefe
| 88869 ||  || — || September 19, 2001 || Socorro || LINEAR || MAS || align=right | 2.2 km || 
|-id=870 bgcolor=#d6d6d6
| 88870 ||  || — || September 20, 2001 || Socorro || LINEAR || — || align=right | 5.7 km || 
|-id=871 bgcolor=#d6d6d6
| 88871 ||  || — || September 20, 2001 || Socorro || LINEAR || KOR || align=right | 2.9 km || 
|-id=872 bgcolor=#E9E9E9
| 88872 ||  || — || September 20, 2001 || Socorro || LINEAR || PAD || align=right | 5.2 km || 
|-id=873 bgcolor=#E9E9E9
| 88873 ||  || — || September 20, 2001 || Socorro || LINEAR || — || align=right | 3.6 km || 
|-id=874 bgcolor=#d6d6d6
| 88874 Wongshingsheuk ||  ||  || September 25, 2001 || Desert Eagle || W. K. Y. Yeung || KOR || align=right | 3.5 km || 
|-id=875 bgcolor=#E9E9E9
| 88875 Posky ||  ||  || September 25, 2001 || Desert Eagle || W. K. Y. Yeung || — || align=right | 1.7 km || 
|-id=876 bgcolor=#E9E9E9
| 88876 ||  || — || September 25, 2001 || Desert Eagle || W. K. Y. Yeung || — || align=right | 3.6 km || 
|-id=877 bgcolor=#fefefe
| 88877 ||  || — || September 25, 2001 || Desert Eagle || W. K. Y. Yeung || NYS || align=right | 2.0 km || 
|-id=878 bgcolor=#E9E9E9
| 88878 Bowenyueli ||  ||  || September 25, 2001 || Desert Eagle || W. K. Y. Yeung || — || align=right | 4.9 km || 
|-id=879 bgcolor=#E9E9E9
| 88879 Sungjaoyiu ||  ||  || September 25, 2001 || Desert Eagle || W. K. Y. Yeung || — || align=right | 2.0 km || 
|-id=880 bgcolor=#E9E9E9
| 88880 ||  || — || September 25, 2001 || Fountain Hills || C. W. Juels, P. R. Holvorcem || EUN || align=right | 3.7 km || 
|-id=881 bgcolor=#fefefe
| 88881 ||  || — || September 21, 2001 || Anderson Mesa || LONEOS || — || align=right | 2.2 km || 
|-id=882 bgcolor=#E9E9E9
| 88882 ||  || — || September 21, 2001 || Anderson Mesa || LONEOS || — || align=right | 3.5 km || 
|-id=883 bgcolor=#d6d6d6
| 88883 ||  || — || September 21, 2001 || Anderson Mesa || LONEOS || — || align=right | 5.3 km || 
|-id=884 bgcolor=#E9E9E9
| 88884 ||  || — || September 22, 2001 || Socorro || LINEAR || BRG || align=right | 3.1 km || 
|-id=885 bgcolor=#fefefe
| 88885 ||  || — || September 22, 2001 || Socorro || LINEAR || — || align=right | 3.8 km || 
|-id=886 bgcolor=#E9E9E9
| 88886 ||  || — || September 28, 2001 || Fountain Hills || C. W. Juels, P. R. Holvorcem || — || align=right | 3.2 km || 
|-id=887 bgcolor=#d6d6d6
| 88887 ||  || — || September 27, 2001 || Palomar || NEAT || TIR || align=right | 5.5 km || 
|-id=888 bgcolor=#E9E9E9
| 88888 ||  || — || September 27, 2001 || Palomar || NEAT || — || align=right | 2.8 km || 
|-id=889 bgcolor=#E9E9E9
| 88889 ||  || — || September 17, 2001 || Anderson Mesa || LONEOS || — || align=right | 4.2 km || 
|-id=890 bgcolor=#E9E9E9
| 88890 ||  || — || September 16, 2001 || Socorro || LINEAR || — || align=right | 2.1 km || 
|-id=891 bgcolor=#d6d6d6
| 88891 ||  || — || September 20, 2001 || Socorro || LINEAR || — || align=right | 4.2 km || 
|-id=892 bgcolor=#d6d6d6
| 88892 ||  || — || September 20, 2001 || Socorro || LINEAR || KAR || align=right | 2.2 km || 
|-id=893 bgcolor=#d6d6d6
| 88893 ||  || — || September 20, 2001 || Socorro || LINEAR || — || align=right | 6.3 km || 
|-id=894 bgcolor=#E9E9E9
| 88894 ||  || — || September 21, 2001 || Socorro || LINEAR || — || align=right | 5.0 km || 
|-id=895 bgcolor=#fefefe
| 88895 ||  || — || September 25, 2001 || Socorro || LINEAR || — || align=right | 3.1 km || 
|-id=896 bgcolor=#E9E9E9
| 88896 ||  || — || September 21, 2001 || Palomar || NEAT || — || align=right | 2.3 km || 
|-id=897 bgcolor=#fefefe
| 88897 ||  || — || September 21, 2001 || Anderson Mesa || LONEOS || V || align=right | 1.6 km || 
|-id=898 bgcolor=#E9E9E9
| 88898 ||  || — || September 22, 2001 || Palomar || NEAT || — || align=right | 3.2 km || 
|-id=899 bgcolor=#E9E9E9
| 88899 ||  || — || September 23, 2001 || Anderson Mesa || LONEOS || — || align=right | 5.2 km || 
|-id=900 bgcolor=#E9E9E9
| 88900 ||  || — || September 25, 2001 || Socorro || LINEAR || DOR || align=right | 7.0 km || 
|}

88901–89000 

|-bgcolor=#E9E9E9
| 88901 ||  || — || September 25, 2001 || Socorro || LINEAR || — || align=right | 5.8 km || 
|-id=902 bgcolor=#E9E9E9
| 88902 ||  || — || September 26, 2001 || Socorro || LINEAR || — || align=right | 4.1 km || 
|-id=903 bgcolor=#E9E9E9
| 88903 || 2001 TL || — || October 6, 2001 || Palomar || NEAT || — || align=right | 1.8 km || 
|-id=904 bgcolor=#fefefe
| 88904 ||  || — || October 7, 2001 || Palomar || NEAT || — || align=right | 1.7 km || 
|-id=905 bgcolor=#fefefe
| 88905 ||  || — || October 11, 2001 || Farpoint || Farpoint Obs. || V || align=right | 1.4 km || 
|-id=906 bgcolor=#fefefe
| 88906 Moutier ||  ||  || October 11, 2001 || Vicques || M. Ory || — || align=right | 3.5 km || 
|-id=907 bgcolor=#fefefe
| 88907 ||  || — || October 7, 2001 || Palomar || NEAT || — || align=right | 2.5 km || 
|-id=908 bgcolor=#fefefe
| 88908 ||  || — || October 8, 2001 || Palomar || NEAT || — || align=right | 1.9 km || 
|-id=909 bgcolor=#E9E9E9
| 88909 ||  || — || October 13, 2001 || Kleť || Kleť Obs. || — || align=right | 4.0 km || 
|-id=910 bgcolor=#fefefe
| 88910 ||  || — || October 11, 2001 || Desert Eagle || W. K. Y. Yeung || — || align=right | 2.6 km || 
|-id=911 bgcolor=#fefefe
| 88911 ||  || — || October 9, 2001 || Socorro || LINEAR || V || align=right | 2.2 km || 
|-id=912 bgcolor=#fefefe
| 88912 ||  || — || October 9, 2001 || Socorro || LINEAR || — || align=right | 2.6 km || 
|-id=913 bgcolor=#fefefe
| 88913 ||  || — || October 9, 2001 || Socorro || LINEAR || — || align=right | 2.6 km || 
|-id=914 bgcolor=#fefefe
| 88914 ||  || — || October 13, 2001 || Socorro || LINEAR || — || align=right | 1.7 km || 
|-id=915 bgcolor=#d6d6d6
| 88915 ||  || — || October 13, 2001 || Socorro || LINEAR || — || align=right | 4.3 km || 
|-id=916 bgcolor=#E9E9E9
| 88916 ||  || — || October 13, 2001 || Socorro || LINEAR || — || align=right | 4.5 km || 
|-id=917 bgcolor=#d6d6d6
| 88917 ||  || — || October 13, 2001 || Socorro || LINEAR || — || align=right | 6.4 km || 
|-id=918 bgcolor=#fefefe
| 88918 ||  || — || October 13, 2001 || Socorro || LINEAR || — || align=right | 2.2 km || 
|-id=919 bgcolor=#fefefe
| 88919 ||  || — || October 13, 2001 || Socorro || LINEAR || NYS || align=right | 2.0 km || 
|-id=920 bgcolor=#d6d6d6
| 88920 ||  || — || October 13, 2001 || Socorro || LINEAR || FIR || align=right | 6.5 km || 
|-id=921 bgcolor=#fefefe
| 88921 ||  || — || October 13, 2001 || Socorro || LINEAR || — || align=right | 1.7 km || 
|-id=922 bgcolor=#d6d6d6
| 88922 ||  || — || October 6, 2001 || Palomar || NEAT || — || align=right | 7.6 km || 
|-id=923 bgcolor=#fefefe
| 88923 ||  || — || October 7, 2001 || Palomar || NEAT || V || align=right | 2.1 km || 
|-id=924 bgcolor=#d6d6d6
| 88924 ||  || — || October 14, 2001 || Desert Eagle || W. K. Y. Yeung || — || align=right | 5.1 km || 
|-id=925 bgcolor=#E9E9E9
| 88925 ||  || — || October 14, 2001 || Desert Eagle || W. K. Y. Yeung || — || align=right | 2.3 km || 
|-id=926 bgcolor=#fefefe
| 88926 ||  || — || October 9, 2001 || Socorro || LINEAR || — || align=right | 2.8 km || 
|-id=927 bgcolor=#E9E9E9
| 88927 ||  || — || October 9, 2001 || Socorro || LINEAR || — || align=right | 2.7 km || 
|-id=928 bgcolor=#E9E9E9
| 88928 ||  || — || October 9, 2001 || Socorro || LINEAR || — || align=right | 4.1 km || 
|-id=929 bgcolor=#fefefe
| 88929 ||  || — || October 13, 2001 || Socorro || LINEAR || — || align=right | 2.2 km || 
|-id=930 bgcolor=#E9E9E9
| 88930 ||  || — || October 14, 2001 || Socorro || LINEAR || — || align=right | 3.6 km || 
|-id=931 bgcolor=#fefefe
| 88931 ||  || — || October 14, 2001 || Socorro || LINEAR || — || align=right | 1.8 km || 
|-id=932 bgcolor=#fefefe
| 88932 ||  || — || October 14, 2001 || Socorro || LINEAR || V || align=right | 1.6 km || 
|-id=933 bgcolor=#E9E9E9
| 88933 ||  || — || October 14, 2001 || Socorro || LINEAR || ADE || align=right | 6.4 km || 
|-id=934 bgcolor=#d6d6d6
| 88934 ||  || — || October 14, 2001 || Socorro || LINEAR || — || align=right | 5.6 km || 
|-id=935 bgcolor=#d6d6d6
| 88935 ||  || — || October 14, 2001 || Socorro || LINEAR || 7:4 || align=right | 7.0 km || 
|-id=936 bgcolor=#fefefe
| 88936 ||  || — || October 14, 2001 || Socorro || LINEAR || — || align=right | 1.8 km || 
|-id=937 bgcolor=#fefefe
| 88937 ||  || — || October 14, 2001 || Socorro || LINEAR || — || align=right | 1.8 km || 
|-id=938 bgcolor=#FA8072
| 88938 ||  || — || October 14, 2001 || Socorro || LINEAR || — || align=right | 1.3 km || 
|-id=939 bgcolor=#E9E9E9
| 88939 ||  || — || October 14, 2001 || Socorro || LINEAR || — || align=right | 5.6 km || 
|-id=940 bgcolor=#d6d6d6
| 88940 ||  || — || October 14, 2001 || Socorro || LINEAR || — || align=right | 6.6 km || 
|-id=941 bgcolor=#E9E9E9
| 88941 ||  || — || October 14, 2001 || Socorro || LINEAR || — || align=right | 4.1 km || 
|-id=942 bgcolor=#E9E9E9
| 88942 ||  || — || October 14, 2001 || Socorro || LINEAR || ADE || align=right | 5.5 km || 
|-id=943 bgcolor=#fefefe
| 88943 ||  || — || October 14, 2001 || Socorro || LINEAR || — || align=right | 1.8 km || 
|-id=944 bgcolor=#fefefe
| 88944 ||  || — || October 14, 2001 || Socorro || LINEAR || V || align=right | 1.3 km || 
|-id=945 bgcolor=#E9E9E9
| 88945 ||  || — || October 14, 2001 || Socorro || LINEAR || — || align=right | 6.2 km || 
|-id=946 bgcolor=#fefefe
| 88946 ||  || — || October 14, 2001 || Socorro || LINEAR || V || align=right | 1.5 km || 
|-id=947 bgcolor=#fefefe
| 88947 ||  || — || October 14, 2001 || Socorro || LINEAR || V || align=right | 1.8 km || 
|-id=948 bgcolor=#fefefe
| 88948 ||  || — || October 14, 2001 || Socorro || LINEAR || V || align=right | 2.3 km || 
|-id=949 bgcolor=#fefefe
| 88949 ||  || — || October 14, 2001 || Socorro || LINEAR || V || align=right | 1.8 km || 
|-id=950 bgcolor=#fefefe
| 88950 ||  || — || October 14, 2001 || Socorro || LINEAR || V || align=right | 2.2 km || 
|-id=951 bgcolor=#E9E9E9
| 88951 ||  || — || October 14, 2001 || Socorro || LINEAR || — || align=right | 2.6 km || 
|-id=952 bgcolor=#fefefe
| 88952 ||  || — || October 14, 2001 || Socorro || LINEAR || V || align=right | 1.2 km || 
|-id=953 bgcolor=#fefefe
| 88953 ||  || — || October 14, 2001 || Socorro || LINEAR || FLO || align=right | 1.6 km || 
|-id=954 bgcolor=#FA8072
| 88954 ||  || — || October 14, 2001 || Socorro || LINEAR || — || align=right | 2.8 km || 
|-id=955 bgcolor=#fefefe
| 88955 ||  || — || October 14, 2001 || Socorro || LINEAR || — || align=right | 2.9 km || 
|-id=956 bgcolor=#fefefe
| 88956 ||  || — || October 14, 2001 || Socorro || LINEAR || — || align=right | 3.3 km || 
|-id=957 bgcolor=#fefefe
| 88957 ||  || — || October 14, 2001 || Socorro || LINEAR || — || align=right | 2.1 km || 
|-id=958 bgcolor=#fefefe
| 88958 ||  || — || October 14, 2001 || Socorro || LINEAR || V || align=right | 1.7 km || 
|-id=959 bgcolor=#FFC2E0
| 88959 ||  || — || October 14, 2001 || Socorro || LINEAR || APO +1km || align=right | 1.2 km || 
|-id=960 bgcolor=#E9E9E9
| 88960 ||  || — || October 14, 2001 || Desert Eagle || W. K. Y. Yeung || HOF || align=right | 6.4 km || 
|-id=961 bgcolor=#E9E9E9
| 88961 Valpertile ||  ||  || October 14, 2001 || Cima Ekar || ADAS || — || align=right | 4.5 km || 
|-id=962 bgcolor=#fefefe
| 88962 ||  || — || October 13, 2001 || Socorro || LINEAR || — || align=right | 1.3 km || 
|-id=963 bgcolor=#E9E9E9
| 88963 ||  || — || October 13, 2001 || Socorro || LINEAR || — || align=right | 1.9 km || 
|-id=964 bgcolor=#E9E9E9
| 88964 ||  || — || October 14, 2001 || Socorro || LINEAR || WIT || align=right | 2.4 km || 
|-id=965 bgcolor=#fefefe
| 88965 ||  || — || October 14, 2001 || Socorro || LINEAR || — || align=right | 2.1 km || 
|-id=966 bgcolor=#E9E9E9
| 88966 ||  || — || October 15, 2001 || Socorro || LINEAR || — || align=right | 2.9 km || 
|-id=967 bgcolor=#E9E9E9
| 88967 ||  || — || October 15, 2001 || Socorro || LINEAR || MAR || align=right | 2.6 km || 
|-id=968 bgcolor=#fefefe
| 88968 ||  || — || October 13, 2001 || Socorro || LINEAR || — || align=right | 1.4 km || 
|-id=969 bgcolor=#d6d6d6
| 88969 ||  || — || October 13, 2001 || Socorro || LINEAR || — || align=right | 8.0 km || 
|-id=970 bgcolor=#d6d6d6
| 88970 ||  || — || October 13, 2001 || Socorro || LINEAR || CHA || align=right | 3.8 km || 
|-id=971 bgcolor=#E9E9E9
| 88971 ||  || — || October 13, 2001 || Socorro || LINEAR || — || align=right | 3.9 km || 
|-id=972 bgcolor=#E9E9E9
| 88972 ||  || — || October 13, 2001 || Socorro || LINEAR || NEM || align=right | 5.2 km || 
|-id=973 bgcolor=#E9E9E9
| 88973 ||  || — || October 13, 2001 || Socorro || LINEAR || — || align=right | 4.1 km || 
|-id=974 bgcolor=#fefefe
| 88974 ||  || — || October 13, 2001 || Socorro || LINEAR || MAS || align=right | 1.3 km || 
|-id=975 bgcolor=#E9E9E9
| 88975 ||  || — || October 13, 2001 || Socorro || LINEAR || — || align=right | 2.8 km || 
|-id=976 bgcolor=#E9E9E9
| 88976 ||  || — || October 13, 2001 || Socorro || LINEAR || HEN || align=right | 2.6 km || 
|-id=977 bgcolor=#fefefe
| 88977 ||  || — || October 13, 2001 || Socorro || LINEAR || — || align=right | 2.7 km || 
|-id=978 bgcolor=#E9E9E9
| 88978 ||  || — || October 13, 2001 || Socorro || LINEAR || — || align=right | 4.0 km || 
|-id=979 bgcolor=#fefefe
| 88979 ||  || — || October 13, 2001 || Socorro || LINEAR || MAS || align=right | 1.7 km || 
|-id=980 bgcolor=#E9E9E9
| 88980 ||  || — || October 13, 2001 || Socorro || LINEAR || — || align=right | 3.4 km || 
|-id=981 bgcolor=#fefefe
| 88981 ||  || — || October 13, 2001 || Socorro || LINEAR || V || align=right | 1.9 km || 
|-id=982 bgcolor=#fefefe
| 88982 ||  || — || October 13, 2001 || Socorro || LINEAR || V || align=right | 2.0 km || 
|-id=983 bgcolor=#d6d6d6
| 88983 ||  || — || October 13, 2001 || Socorro || LINEAR || — || align=right | 6.2 km || 
|-id=984 bgcolor=#fefefe
| 88984 ||  || — || October 13, 2001 || Socorro || LINEAR || NYS || align=right | 2.0 km || 
|-id=985 bgcolor=#fefefe
| 88985 ||  || — || October 13, 2001 || Socorro || LINEAR || V || align=right | 1.8 km || 
|-id=986 bgcolor=#E9E9E9
| 88986 ||  || — || October 13, 2001 || Socorro || LINEAR || — || align=right | 3.6 km || 
|-id=987 bgcolor=#fefefe
| 88987 ||  || — || October 13, 2001 || Socorro || LINEAR || — || align=right | 1.6 km || 
|-id=988 bgcolor=#d6d6d6
| 88988 ||  || — || October 13, 2001 || Socorro || LINEAR || KOR || align=right | 3.4 km || 
|-id=989 bgcolor=#d6d6d6
| 88989 ||  || — || October 13, 2001 || Socorro || LINEAR || — || align=right | 5.3 km || 
|-id=990 bgcolor=#fefefe
| 88990 ||  || — || October 13, 2001 || Socorro || LINEAR || V || align=right | 2.7 km || 
|-id=991 bgcolor=#E9E9E9
| 88991 ||  || — || October 13, 2001 || Socorro || LINEAR || GEF || align=right | 2.6 km || 
|-id=992 bgcolor=#fefefe
| 88992 ||  || — || October 13, 2001 || Socorro || LINEAR || MAS || align=right | 1.5 km || 
|-id=993 bgcolor=#d6d6d6
| 88993 ||  || — || October 13, 2001 || Socorro || LINEAR || EOS || align=right | 4.3 km || 
|-id=994 bgcolor=#fefefe
| 88994 ||  || — || October 13, 2001 || Socorro || LINEAR || — || align=right | 1.6 km || 
|-id=995 bgcolor=#d6d6d6
| 88995 ||  || — || October 13, 2001 || Socorro || LINEAR || EOS || align=right | 3.7 km || 
|-id=996 bgcolor=#E9E9E9
| 88996 ||  || — || October 13, 2001 || Socorro || LINEAR || — || align=right | 5.6 km || 
|-id=997 bgcolor=#E9E9E9
| 88997 ||  || — || October 13, 2001 || Socorro || LINEAR || — || align=right | 4.5 km || 
|-id=998 bgcolor=#E9E9E9
| 88998 ||  || — || October 13, 2001 || Socorro || LINEAR || — || align=right | 3.7 km || 
|-id=999 bgcolor=#fefefe
| 88999 ||  || — || October 13, 2001 || Socorro || LINEAR || — || align=right | 1.7 km || 
|-id=000 bgcolor=#E9E9E9
| 89000 ||  || — || October 13, 2001 || Socorro || LINEAR || — || align=right | 2.8 km || 
|}

References

External links 
 Discovery Circumstances: Numbered Minor Planets (85001)–(90000) (IAU Minor Planet Center)

0088